Pinechas, Pinchas, Pinhas, or Pin'has (—Hebrew for "Phinehas," a name, the sixth word and the first distinctive word in the parashah) is the 41st weekly Torah portion in the annual Jewish cycle of Torah reading and the eighth in the Book of Numbers. It tells of Phinehas's killing of a couple, ending a plague, and of the daughters of Zelophehad's successful plea for land rights. It constitutes . The parashah is made up of 7,853 Hebrew letters, 1,887 Hebrew words, 168 verses, and 280 lines in a Torah scroll (Sefer Torah).

Jews generally read it in July, or rarely in late June or early August. As the parashah sets out laws for the Jewish holidays, Jews also read parts of the parashah as Torah readings for many Jewish holidays.  is the Torah reading for the New Moon on a weekday (including when the sixth or seventh day of Hanukkah falls on Rosh Chodesh).  is the maftir Torah reading for Shabbat Rosh Chodesh.  is the maftir Torah reading for the first two days of Passover.  is the maftir Torah reading for the intermediate days and seventh and eighth days of Passover.  is the maftir Torah reading for each day of Shavuot.  is the maftir Torah reading for each day of Rosh Hashanah.  is the maftir Torah reading for the Yom Kippur morning service.  is the maftir Torah reading for the first two days of Sukkot.  is the Torah reading for the first intermediate day of Sukkot.  is the Torah reading for the second intermediate day of Sukkot.  is the Torah reading for the third intermediate day of Sukkot.  is the Torah reading for the fourth intermediate day of Sukkot, as well as for Hoshana Rabbah. And  is the maftir Torah reading for both Shemini Atzeret and Simchat Torah.

Readings

First reading—Numbers 25:10–26:4

In the first reading, God announced that because Phinehas had displayed his passion for God, God granted him a pact of friendship and priesthood for all time. (In a Torahscroll, the letter  in the verse "Behold, I give him My covenant of peace," is split.) God then told Moses to attack the Midianites to repay them for their trickery luring Israelite men to worship Baal Peor.

Second reading—Numbers 26:5–51

God instructed Moses and Eleazar to take a census of Israelite men 20 years old and up.

In the second reading, the census showed the following populations by tribe:

Reuben: 43,730
Simeon: 22,200
Gad: 40,500
Judah: 76,500
Issachar: 64,300
Zebulun: 60,500
Manasseh: 52,700
Ephraim: 32,500
Benjamin: 45,600
Dan: 64,400
Asher: 53,400
Naphtali: 45,400
The total (excluding the tribe of Levi) was 601,730 (slightly lower than the total in the first census, but with significant differences among the tribes).

The text notes in passing that when Korah's band agitated against God, the earth swallowed up Dathan and Abiram with Korah, but Korah's sons did not die.

Third reading—Numbers 26:52–27:5
In the third reading, God told Moses to apportion shares of the land according to population among those counted, and by lot. The Levite men aged a month old and up amounted to 23,000, and they were not included in the regular enrollment of Israelites, as they were not to have land assigned to them.
Among the persons whom Moses and Eleazar enrolled was not one of those enrolled in the first census at the wilderness of Sinai, except Caleb and Joshua. The daughters of Zelophehad approached Moses, Eleazar, the chieftains, and the assembly at the entrance of the Tabernacle, saying that their father left no sons, and asking that they be given a land holding. Moses brought their case before God.

Fourth reading—Numbers 27:6–23
In the fourth reading, God told Moses that the daughters' plea was just and instructed Moses to transfer their father's share of land to them. God further instructed that if a man died without leaving a son, the Israelites were to transfer his property to his daughter, or failing a daughter to his brothers, or failing a brother to his father's brothers, or failing brothers of his father, to the nearest relative. God told Moses to climb the heights of Abarim and view the Land of Israel, saying that when he had seen it, he would die, because he disobeyed God's command to uphold God's sanctity in the people's sight when he brought water from the rock in the wilderness of Zin. Moses asked God to appoint someone over the community, so that the Israelites would not be like sheep without a shepherd. God told Moses to single out Joshua, lay his hand on him, and commission him before Eleazar and the whole community. Joshua was to present himself to Eleazar the priest, who was to seek the decision of the Urim and Thummim on whether to go out or come in.

Fifth reading—Numbers 28:1–15
In the fifth reading, God told Moses to command the Israelites to be punctilious in presenting the offerings due God at stated times. The text then details the offerings for the Sabbath and Rosh Chodesh.

Sixth reading—Numbers 28:16–29:11
The sixth reading details the offerings for Passover, Shavuot, Rosh Hashanah, and Yom Kippur.

Seventh reading—Numbers 29:12–30:1
The seventh reading details the offerings for Sukkot and Shmini Atzeret. At the end of the reading, Moses concluded his teachings to the whole community about the offerings.

Readings according to the triennial cycle
Jews who read the Torah according to the triennial cycle of Torah reading read the parashah according to the following schedule:

In inner-Biblical interpretation
The parashah has parallels or is discussed in these Biblical sources:

Numbers chapter 25

Frymer-Kensky concluded that Deuteronomy stresses the moral lesson: Very simply, the guilty perished, and those who were alive to hear Moses were innocent survivors who could avoid destruction by staying fast to God.

In , Phinehas and ten princes of Israelite Tribes questioned the Reubenites', Gadites', and Manassites' later building an altar across the Jordan, recalling that the Israelites had not cleansed themselves to that day of the iniquity of Peor, even though a plague had come upon the congregation at the time. Frymer-Kensky noted that the book of Joshua emphasizes the collective nature of sin and punishment, that the transgression of the Israelites at Peor still hung over them, and that any sin of the Reubenites, Gadites, and Manassites would bring down punishment on all Israel.

In , God recalled Israel's rebellion and God's resolve to pour out God's fury on them in the wilderness. God held back then for the sake of God's Name, but swore that God would scatter them among the nations, because they looked with longing at idols. Frymer-Kensky called Ezekiel's memory the most catastrophic: Because the Israelites rebelled in the Baal-Peor incident, God vowed that they would ultimately lose the Land that they had not yet even entered. Even after the exile to Babylon, the incident loomed large in Israel's memory.

 reports that the Israelites attached themselves to Baal Peor and ate sacrifices offered to the dead, provoking God's anger and a plague.  reports that Phinehas stepped forward and intervened, the plague ceased, and it was reckoned to his merit forever. Michael Fishbane wrote that in retelling the story, the Psalmist notably omitted the explicit account of Phinehas's violent lancing of the offenders and substituted an account of the deed that could be read as nonviolent.

Numbers chapter 26
In , God directed Moses and Eleazer to "take the sum of all the congregation of the children of Israel, from 20 years old and upward, . . . all that are able to go forth to war in Israel." That census yielded 43,730 men for Reuben, 40,500 men for Gad, and 52,700 men for Manasseh—for a total of 136,930 adult men "able to go forth to war" from the three tribes. Kli Yakar suggested that more than 100,000 men crossed over the Jordan to help, but when they saw the miracles at the Jordan, many concluded that God would ensure the Israelites' success and they were not needed.

Numbers chapter 27

Numbers chapter 28
In , God commanded the Israelite people to bring to the Sanctuary, "as a regular burnt offering every day, two yearling lambs without blemish."

Passover

 refers to the Festival of Passover. In the Hebrew Bible, Passover is called:
"Passover" (Pesach);
"The Feast of Unleavened Bread";;;;;;;;;,. and

Some explain the double nomenclature of "Passover" and "Feast of Unleavened Bread" as referring to two separate feasts that the Israelites combined sometime between the Exodus and when the Biblical text became settled.  and  indicate that the dedication of the firstborn also became associated with the festival.

Some believe that the "Feast of Unleavened Bread" was an agricultural festival at which the Israelites celebrated the beginning of the grain harvest.

"Passover," on the other hand, was associated with a thanksgiving sacrifice of a lamb, also called "the Passover," "the Passover lamb," or "the Passover offering.",,;,

Some believe that the propinquity of the dates of the two Festivals led to their confusion and merger.

 and 27 link the word "Passover" (Pesach) to God's act to "pass over" the Israelites' houses in the plague of the firstborn. In the Torah, the consolidated Passover and Feast of Unleavened Bread thus commemorate the Israelites' liberation from Egypt. ;;;;,

The Hebrew Bible frequently notes the Israelites' observance of Passover at turning points in their history.  reports God's direction to the Israelites to observe Passover in the wilderness of Sinai on the anniversary of their liberation from Egypt.  reports that upon entering the Promised Land, the Israelites kept the Passover on the plains of Jericho and ate unleavened cakes and parched corn, produce of the land, the next day.  reports that King Josiah commanded the Israelites to keep the Passover in Jerusalem as part of Josiah's reforms, but also notes that the Israelites had not kept such a Passover from the days of the Biblical judges nor in all the days of the kings of Israel or the kings of Judah, calling into question the observance of even Kings David and Solomon. The more reverent , however, reports that Solomon offered sacrifices on the Festivals, including the Feast of Unleavened Bread. And  reports King Hezekiah's observance of a second Passover anew, as sufficient numbers of neither the priests nor the people were prepared to do so before then. And  reports that the Israelites returned from the Babylonian captivity observed Passover, ate the Passover lamb, and kept the Feast of Unleavened Bread seven days with joy.

Shavuot
 refers to the Festival of Shavuot. In the Hebrew Bible, Shavuot is called:
The Feast of Weeks;
The Day of the First-fruits;
The Feast of Harvest; and
A holy convocation.

 associates Shavuot with the first-fruits of the wheat harvest. In turn,  set out the ceremony for the bringing of the first fruits.

To arrive at the correct date,  instructs counting seven weeks from the day after the day of rest of Passover, the day that they brought the sheaf of barley for waving. Similarly,  directs counting seven weeks from when they first put the sickle to the standing barley.

 sets out a course of offerings for the fiftieth day, including a meal-offering of two loaves made from fine flour from the first-fruits of the harvest; burnt-offerings of seven lambs, one bull, and two rams; a sin-offering of a goat; and a peace-offering of two lambs. Similarly,  sets out a course of offerings including a meal-offering; burnt-offerings of two bulls, one ram, and seven lambs; and one goat to make atonement.  directs a freewill-offering in relation to God's blessing.

 and  ordain a holy convocation in which the Israelites were not to work.

 reports that Solomon offered burnt-offerings on the Feast of Weeks.

Numbers chapter 29

Rosh Hashanah
 refers to the Festival of Rosh Hashanah. In the Hebrew Bible, Rosh Hashanah is called:
a memorial proclaimed with the blast of horns;
a day of blowing the horn; and
a holy convocation.

 and  both describe Rosh Hashanah as a holy convocation, a day of solemn rest in which no servile work is to be done, involving the blowing of horns and an offering to God.

 reports that in the Persian era, when the seventh month came, the Israelites gathered together in Jerusalem, and the priests offered burnt-offerings to God, morning and evening, as written in the Law of Moses.

 reports that it was on Rosh Hashanah (the first day of the seventh month) that all the Israelites gathered together before the water gate and Ezra the scribe read the Law from early morning until midday. And Nehemiah, Ezra, and the Levites told the people that the day was holy to the Lord their God; they should neither mourn nor weep; but they should go their way, eat the fat, drink the sweet, and send portions to those who had nothing.

 likely refers to Rosh Hashanah when it enjoins, "Blow the horn at the new moon, at the full moon of our feast day. For it is a statute for Israel, an ordinance of the God of Jacob."

Yom Kippur
 refers to the Festival of Yom Kippur. In the Hebrew Bible, Yom Kippur is called:

the Day of Atonement or a Day of Atonement;
a Sabbath of solemn rest; and
a holy convocation.

Similarly,  and  call it a "Sabbath of solemn rest." And  and  institute the observance as "a statute forever."

 sets out detailed procedures for the priest's atonement ritual during the time of the Temple.

 instructs that after seven Sabbatical years, on the Jubilee year, on the day of atonement, the Israelites were to proclaim liberty throughout the land with the blast of the horn and return every man to his possession and to his family.

In , the Haftarah for Yom Kippur morning, God describes "the fast that I have chosen [on] the day for a man to afflict his soul."  make clear that "to afflict the soul" was understood as fasting.

Sukkot
And  refers to the Festival of Sukkot. In the Hebrew Bible, Sukkot is called:
"The Feast of Ingathering";
"The Feast" or "the festival";,;;.
"The Feast of the Lord";
"The festival of the seventh month"; and
"A holy convocation" or "a sacred occasion."

Sukkot's agricultural origin is evident from the name "The Feast of Ingathering," from the ceremonies accompanying it, and from the season and occasion of its celebration: "At the end of the year when you gather in your labors out of the field"; "after you have gathered in from your threshing-floor and from your winepress." It was a thanksgiving for the fruit harvest. And in what may explain the festival's name, Isaiah reports that grape harvesters kept booths in their vineyards. Coming as it did at the completion of the harvest, Sukkot was regarded as a general thanksgiving for the bounty of nature in the year that had passed.

Sukkot became one of the most important feasts in Judaism, as indicated by its designation as "the Feast of the Lord" or simply "the Feast." Perhaps because of its wide attendance, Sukkot became the appropriate time for important state ceremonies. Moses instructed the children of Israel to gather for a reading of the Law during Sukkot every seventh year. King Solomon dedicated the Temple in Jerusalem on Sukkot. And Sukkot was the first sacred occasion observed after the resumption of sacrifices in Jerusalem after the Babylonian captivity.

In the time of Nehemiah, after the Babylonian captivity, the Israelites celebrated Sukkot by making and dwelling in booths, a practice of which Nehemiah reports: "the Israelites had not done so from the days of Joshua." In a practice related to that of the Four Species, Nehemiah also reports that the Israelites found in the Law the commandment that they "go out to the mountains and bring leafy branches of olive trees, pine trees, myrtles, palms and [other] leafy trees to make booths." In , God told Moses to command the people: "On the first day you shall take the product of  trees, branches of palm trees, boughs of leafy trees, and willows of the brook," and "You shall live in booths seven days; all citizens in Israel shall live in booths, in order that future generations may know that I made the Israelite people live in booths when I brought them out of the land of Egypt." The book of Numbers, however, indicates that while in the wilderness, the Israelites dwelt in tents. Some secular scholars consider  (the commandments regarding booths and the four species) to be an insertion by a late redactor.

Jeroboam son of Nebat, King of the northern Kingdom of Israel, whom  describes as practicing "his evil way," celebrated a festival on the fifteenth day of the eighth month, one month after Sukkot, "in imitation of the festival in Judah." "While Jeroboam was standing on the altar to present the offering, the man of God, at the command of the Lord, cried out against the altar" in disapproval.

According to the prophet Zechariah, in the messianic era, Sukkot will become a universal festival, and all nations will make pilgrimages annually to Jerusalem to celebrate the feast there.

In early nonrabbinic interpretation
The parashah has parallels or is discussed in these early nonrabbinic sources:

Numbers chapter 25

Isaiah Gafni argued that 1 Maccabees implies that like Phinehas, the Hasmonean dynasty legitimately assumed the role of priesthood by virtue of their zeal.

Numbers chapter 29
A letter from Simon bar Kokhba written during the Bar Kokhba revolt found in the Cave of Letters includes commands to a subordinate to assemble components of the lulav and etrog, apparently so as to celebrate Sukkot.

In classical rabbinic interpretation
The parashah is discussed in these rabbinic sources from the era of the Mishnah and the Talmud:

Numbers chapter 25
Rabbi Johanan taught that Phinehas was able to accomplish his act of zealotry only because God performed six miracles: First, upon hearing Phinehas's warning, Zimri should have withdrawn from Cozbi and ended his transgression, but he did not. Second, Zimri should have cried out for help from his fellow Simeonites, but he did not. Third, Phinheas was able to drive his spear exactly through the sexual organs of Zimri and Cozbi as they were engaged in the act. Fourth, Zimri and Cozbi did not slip off the spear, but remained fixed so that others could witness their transgression. Fifth, an angel came and lifted up the lintel so that Phinehas could exit holding the spear. And sixth, an angel came and sowed destruction among the people, distracting the Simeonites from killing Phinheas.

Rabbah bar bar Hana said in Rabbi Johanan's name that had Zimri withdrawn from his mistress and Phinehas still killed him, Phinehas would have been liable to execution for murder, and had Zimri killed Phinehas in self-defense, he would not have been liable to execution for murder, as Phinehas was a pursuer seeking to take Zimri's life.

The Jerusalem Talmud answered that he saw the incident and remembered the law that zealots may beat up one who has sexual relations with an Aramean woman. But the Jerusalem Talmud reported that it was taught that this was not with the approval of sages.

The Gemara told that after Phinehas killed Zimri and Cozbi, the Israelites began berating Phinehas for his presumption, as he himself was descended from a Midianite idolater, Jethro. The Israelites said: "See this son of Puti (Putiel, or Jethro) whose maternal grandfather fattened (pittem) cattle for idols, and who has now slain the prince of a tribe of Israel (Zimri)!" And the Gemara explained  to indicate that the atonement that Phinehas had made was worthy to atone permanently.

The Gemara then provided an alternative explanation:  could mean that Phinehas descended from Joseph, who conquered his passions (resisting Potiphar's wife, as reported in ). But the Gemara asked, did not the tribes sneer at Phinehas and question how a youth (Phinehas) whose mother's father crammed calves for idol-worship could kill the head of a tribe in Israel (Zimri, Prince of Simeon, as reported in ). The Gemara explained that the real explanation was that Phinehas descended from both Joseph and Jethro. If Phinehas's mother's father descended from Joseph, then Phinehas's mother's mother descended from Jethro. And if Phinehas's mother's father descended from Jethro, then Phinehas's mother's mother descended from Joseph. The Gemara explained that  implies this dual explanation of "Putiel" when it says, "of the daughters of Putiel," because the plural "daughters" implies two lines of ancestry (from both Joseph and Jethro).

A Midrash deduced from God's giving Phinehas peace as a reward in  that peace is a precious thing. Similarly, another Midrash deduced from the same verse that peace is beloved.

Reading the words of  that Phinehas "made atonement for the children of Israel," a Midrash taught that although he did not strictly offer a sacrifice to justify the expression "atonement," his shedding the blood of the wicked was as though he had offered a sacrifice.

Reading , "And the Lord spoke to me, 'Distress not the Moabites, neither contend with them in battle,'" Ulla argued that it certainly could not have entered the mind of Moses to wage war without God's authorization. So we must deduce that Moses on his own reasoned that if in the case of the Midianites who came only to assist the Moabites (in ), God commanded (in ), "Vex the Midianites and smite them," in the case of the Moabites themselves, the same injunction should apply even more strongly. But God told Moses that the idea that Moses had in his mind was not the idea that God had in God's mind. For God was to bring two doves forth from the Moabites and the Ammonites—Ruth the Moabitess and Naamah the Ammonitess.

Numbers chapter 26
A Midrash taught that the Israelites were counted on ten occasions: (1) when they went down to Egypt, (2) when they went up out of Egypt, (3) at the first census in Numbers, (4) at the second census in Numbers, (5) once for the banners, (6) once in the time of Joshua for the division of the land of Israel, (7) once by Saul, (8) a second time by Saul, (9) once by David, and (10) once in the time of Ezra.

Noting that  speaks of "after the plague" immediately before reporting that God ordered the census, a Midrash concluded that whenever the Israelites were struck, they needed to be counted, as a shepherd will count the sheep after a wolf attacks. Alternatively, the Midrash taught that God ordered Moses to count the Israelites as Moses neared death, much as a shepherd entrusted with a set number of sheep must count those that remain when the shepherd returns the sheep to their owner.

A Midrash explained that Moses numbered the Israelites like a shepherd to whom an owner entrusted a flock by number. When the shepherd came to the end of the shepherd's time, on returning them, the shepherd had to count them again. When Israel left Egypt, God entrusted the Israelites to Moses by number, as  reports, "And the Lord spoke to Moses in the wilderness of Sinai . . . 'Take the sum of all the congregation of the children of Israel.'" And  records that "the children of Israel journeyed from Rameses to Succoth, about 600,000 men on foot," demonstrating that Moses took responsibility for the Israelites in Egypt by number.

The Rabbis taught in a Baraita that upon entering a barn to measure the new grain one should recite the blessing, "May it be Your will O Lord, our God, that You may send blessing upon the work of our hands." Once one has begun to measure, one should say, "Blessed be the One who sends blessing into this heap." If, however, one first measured the grain and then recited the blessing, then prayer is in vain, because blessing is not to be found in anything that has been already weighed or measured or numbered, but only in a thing hidden from sight.

Rabbi Isaac taught that it is forbidden to count Israel even for the purpose of fulfilling a commandment, as  can be read, "And he numbered them with pebbles (be-bezek)." Rav Ashi demurred, asking how Rabbi Isaac knew that the word , bezek, in  means being broken pieces (that is, pebbles). Rabbi Eleazar taught that whoever counts Israel transgresses a Biblical prohibition, as  says, "Yet the number of the children of Israel shall be as the sand of the sea, which cannot be measured." Rav Nahman bar Isaac said that such a person would transgress two prohibitions, for  says, "Which cannot be measured nor numbered." Rabbi Samuel bar Nahmani reported that Rabbi Jonathan noted a potential contradiction, as  says, "Yet the number of the children of Israel shall be as the sand of the sea" (implying a finite number, but  also says, "Which cannot be numbered" (implying that they will not have a finite number). The Gemara answered that there is no contradiction, for the latter part of  speaks of the time when Israel fulfils God's will, while the earlier part of  speaks of the time when they do not fulfill God's will. Rabbi said on behalf of Abba Jose ben Dosthai that there is no contradiction, for the latter part of  speaks of counting done by human beings, while the earlier part of  speaks of counting by Heaven.

A Tanna in the name of Rabbi deduced from the words "the sons of Korah did not die" in  that Providence set up a special place for them to stand on high in Gehinnom. There, Korah's sons sat and sang praises to God. Rabbah bar bar Hana told that once when he was travelling, an Arab showed him where the earth swallowed Korah's congregation. Rabbah bar bar Hana saw two cracks in the ground from which smoke issued. He took a piece of wool, soaked it in water, attached it to the point of his spear, and passed it over the cracks, and the wool was singed. The Arab told Rabbah bar bar Hana to listen, and he heard them saying, "Moses and his Torah are true, but Korah's company are liars." The Arab told Rabbah bar bar Hana that every 30 days Gehinnom caused them to return for judgment, as if they were being stirred like meat in a pot, and every 30 days they said those same words.

A Midrash explained why the sons of Korah were saved. When they were sitting with their father, and they saw Moses, they hung their heads and lamented that if they stood up for Moses, they would be showing disrespect for their father, but if they did not rise, they would be disregarding , "You shall rise up before the hoary head." They concluded that they had better rise for their teacher Moses, even though they would thereby be showing disrespect for our father. At that moment, thoughts of repentance stirred in their hearts.

A Midrash taught that at the moment when the earth opened up, Korah's sons were suspended in the air. When the sons of Korah saw the gaping abyss below on one side and the fire of Gehinnom on the other, they were unable to open their mouths to confess. But as soon as thoughts of repentance stirred in their hearts, God accepted them. Whatever thoughts one of the sons developed, the others developed as well, so that all three were of one heart. The area around them split apart, but the spot on which each stood was not touched. They stood separately like three pillars. Moses, Aaron, and all the great scholars came to hear the song of the sons of Korah, and from this they learned to sing songs before God.

The Pirke De-Rabbi Eliezer taught that the prophet Jonah saved the fish that swallowed Jonah from being devoured by Leviathan, and in exchange, the fish showed Jonah the sea and the depths. The fish showed Jonah the great river of the waters of the Ocean, the paths of the Reed Sea through which Israel passed in the Exodus, the place from where the waves of the sea and its billows flow, the pillars of the earth in its foundations, the lowest Sheol, Gehinnom, and what was beneath the Temple in Jerusalem. Beneath the Temple, Jonah saw the Foundation Stone fixed in the depths, and the sons of Korah were standing and praying over it. The sons of Korah told Jonah that he stood beneath the Temple of God, and if he prayed, he would be answered. Forthwith, Jonah prayed to God to restore Jonah to life.

A Baraita taught that the Serah the daughter of Asher mentioned in both  and  survived from the time Israel went down to Egypt to the time of the wandering in the Wilderness. The Gemara taught that Moses went to her to ask where the Egyptians had buried Joseph. She told him that the Egyptians had made a metal coffin for Joseph. The Egyptians set the coffin in the Nile so that its waters would be blessed. Moses went to the bank of the Nile and called to Joseph that the time had arrived for God to deliver the Israelites, and the oath that Joseph had imposed upon the children of Israel in  had reached its time of fulfillment. Moses called on Joseph to show himself, and Joseph's coffin immediately rose to the surface of the water.

Similarly, a Midrash taught that Serah (mentioned in ) conveyed to the Israelites a secret password handed down from Jacob so that they would recognize their deliverer. The Midrash told that when (as  reports) "Aaron spoke all the words" to the Israelite people, "And the people believed" (as  reports), they did not believe only because they had seen the signs. Rather, (as  reports), "They heard that the Lord had visited"—they believed because they heard, not because they saw the signs. What made them believe was the sign of God's visitation that God communicated to them through a tradition from Jacob, which Jacob handed down to Joseph, Joseph to his brothers, and Asher, the son of Jacob, handed down to his daughter Serah, who was still alive at the time of Moses and Aaron. Asher told Serah that any redeemer who would come and say the password to the Israelites would be their true deliverer. So when Moses came and said the password, the people believed him at once.

It was taught in a Baraita that Rabbi Josiah said that the land of Israel was apportioned according to those who came out of Egypt, as  says, "according to the names of the tribes of their fathers they shall inherit." The Gemara proposed that "unto these" meant adults, to the exclusion of minors. But Rabbi Jonathan taught that the land was apportioned according to those who entered the land, for  says, "Unto these the land shall be divided for an inheritance." The Gemara posited that according to this view,  taught that the manner of inheritance of the land of Israel differed from all other modes of inheritance in the world. For in all other modes of inheritance in the world, the living inherit from the dead, but in this case, the dead inherited from the living. Rabbi Simeon ben Eleazar taught a third view—that the land was divided both according to those who left Egypt and also according to those who entered the land of Israel, so as to carry out both verses. The Gemara explained that according to this view, one among those who came out of Egypt received a share among those who came out of Egypt, and one who entered the land of Israel received a share among those who entered the land. And one who belonged to both categories received a share among both categories.

Abba Halifa of Keruya asked Rabbi Hiyya bar Abba why  reported that 70 people from Jacob's household came to Egypt, while  enumerated only 69 individuals. Rabbi Hiyya reported that Rabbi Hama bar Hanina taught that the seventieth person was the mother of Moses, Jochebed, who was conceived on the way from Canaan to Egypt and born as Jacob's family passed between the city walls as they entered Egypt, for  reported that Jochebed "was born to Levi in Egypt," implying that her conception was not in Egypt.

The Gemara asked why the Tannaim felt that the allocation of the Land of Israel "according to the names of the tribes of their fathers" in  meant that the allocation was with reference to those who left Egypt; perhaps, the Gemara supposed, it might have meant the 12 tribes and that the Land was to be divided into 12 equal portions?

This teaches that God grieved for Nadab and Abihu, for they were dear to God. And thus  quotes God to say: "Through them who are near to Me I will be sanctified."

Numbers chapter 27
A Midrash explained why the report of  about the daughters of Zelophehad follows immediately after the report of  about the death of the wilderness generation. The Midrash noted that  says, "there was not left a man of them, save Caleb the son of Jephunneh," because the men had been unwilling to enter the Land. But the Midrash taught that  says, "then drew near the daughters of Zelophehad," to show that the women still sought an inheritance in the Land. Similarly, the Midrash noted that  says that in the incident of the spies, "the men . . . when they returned, made all the congregation to murmur against him." The Midrash taught that in that generation, the women built up fences that the men broke down.

Noting that  reported the generations from Joseph to the daughters of Zelophehad, the Sifre taught that the daughters of Zelophehad loved the Land of Israel just as much as their ancestor Joseph did (when in  he extracted an oath from his brothers to return his body to the Land of Israel for burial).

Rabbi Joshua taught that Zelophehad's daughters' in  petitioned first the assembly, then the chieftains, then Eleazar, and finally Moses, but Abba Hanan said in the name of Rabbi Eliezer taught that Zelophehad's daughters stood before all of them as they were sitting together.

Rabbi Judah ben Bathyra answered Akiva that Akiva would have to give an account for his accusation. For either Akiva was right that Zelophehad was the man executed for gathering sticks on the Sabbath, and Akiva revealed something that the Torah shielded from public view, or Akiva was wrong that Zelophehad was the man executed for gathering sticks on the Sabbath, and Akiva cast a stigma upon a righteous man. But the Gemara answered that Akiva learned a tradition from the Oral Torah (that went back to Sinai, and thus the Torah did not shield the matter from public view). The Gemara then asked, according to Rabbi Judah ben Bathyra, of what sin did Zelophehad die (as his daughters reported in  that "he died in his own sin")?

Rabbi Hidka recounted that Simeon of Shikmona, a fellow disciple of Rabbi Akiva, taught that Moses knew that the daughters of Zelophehad were entitled to inherit, but he did not know whether they were to take the double portion of the firstborn or not (and thus, as  reports, took the case to God).

Rabbi Hanina (or some say Rabbi Josiah) taught that , when Moses found himself unable to decide the case of the daughters of Zelophehad, reports the punishment of Moses for his arrogance when he told the judges in  "the cause that is too hard for you, you shall bring to me, and I will hear it." Rav Nahman objected to Rabbi Hanina's interpretation, noting that Moses did not say that he would always have the answers, but merely that he would rule if he knew the answer or seek instruction if he did not. Rav Nahman cited a Baraita to explain the case of the daughters of Zelophehad: God had intended that Moses write the laws of inheritance, but found the daughters of Zelophehad worthy to have the section recorded on their account.

The Mishnah taught that the daughters of Zelophehad took three shares in the inheritance of the Land of Israel: (1) the share of their father Zelophehad, who was among those who came out of Egypt; (2) their father's share among his brothers in the estate of Hepher, Zelophehad's father; and (3) an extra share in Hepher's estate, as Zelophehad was a firstborn son, who takes two shares.

A Baraita taught that Zelophehad's daughters were wise, Torah students, and righteous. According to the Gemara, they demonstrated their wisdom by raising their case in a timely fashion, just as Moses was expounding the law of levirate marriage, or yibbum, and they argued for their inheritance by analogy to that law.

Reading , the Mishnah taught these rules for the order of inheritance: the son preceded the daughter, and the son's offspring preceded the daughter. The daughter preceded the decedent's brothers, and the daughters' offspring preceded the brothers. The decedent's brothers precede the decedent's father's brothers, and the brothers' offspring precede the father's brothers. The general rule was that the offspring of one who had precedence in inheritance also had precedence. The father had precedence over all his offspring (if none were the direct offspring of the decedent).

The Gemara implied that the sin of Moses in striking the rock at Meribah compared favorably to the sin of David. The Gemara reported that Moses and David were two good leaders of Israel. David, however, begged that his sin be blotted out, as  says, "Happy is he whose transgression is forgiven, whose sin is pardoned." The Gemara compared the cases of Moses and David to the cases of two women whom the court sentenced to be lashed. The woman who had eaten unripe figs begged the court to make known for what offense she was being flogged, lest people say that she was being punished for the same sin as the other woman. The court thus made known her sin, and the Torah repeatedly records the sin of Moses.

God, however, replied (in the words of ) that "Whoever keeps the fig-tree shall eat its fruit; and whoever waits on the master shall be honored." The sons of Moses sat idly by and did not study Torah, but Joshua served Moses and showed him great honor, rose early in the morning and remained late at night at the House of Assembly, and arranged the benches and spread the mats. As he had served Moses with all his might, he was worthy to serve Israel, and thus God in  directed Moses to "take Joshua the son of Nun" as his successor.

Reading , "The sun also rises, and the sun goes down," Rabbi Abba taught that since we of course know that the sun rises and sets,  means that before God causes the sun of one righteous person to set, God causes the sun of another righteous person to rise. Thus before God caused the sun of Moses to set, God caused Joshua's sun to rise, as  reports, "And the Lord said to Moses: 'Take Joshua the son of Nun . . . and lay your hand upon him.'"

In , Wisdom (which the Rabbis equated with the Torah) says, "By me kings reign, and princes decree justice." A Midrash taught that  thus reports what actually happened to Joshua, for as  reports, it was not the sons of Moses who succeeded their father, but Joshua. And because Joshua served his master Moses, Joshua attained the privilege of receiving the Holy Spirit, as  reports, "Now it came to pass after the death of Moses . . . that the Lord spoke to Joshua, the minister of Moses."

The elders of that generation compared the countenance of Moses to that of the sun and the countenance of Joshua to that of the moon. The elders considered it a shame and a reproach that there had been such a decline in the stature of Israel's leadership in the course of just one generation.

The Mishnah taught that "one inquired [of the Urim and Thummim] only for a king." The Gemara asked what the Scriptural basis was for this teaching. The Gemara answered that Rabbi Abbahu read , "And he shall stand before Eleazar the priest, who shall inquire for him by the judgment of the Urim . . . ; at his word shall they go out . . . , both he, and all the children of Israel with him, even all the congregation," to teach that "he" (that is, Joshua) meant the king, "and all the children of Israel with him" (that is, Eleazar) meant the priest Anointed for Battle, and "even all the congregation" meant the Sanhedrin.

Rabbi Eliezer noted that in  God directs that Joshua "shall stand before Eleazar the priest," and yet Scripture does not record that Joshua ever sought Eleazar's guidance.

The Gemara taught that although the decree of a prophet could be revoked, the decree of the Urim and Thummim could not be revoked, as  says, "By the judgment of the Urim." A Baraita explained why the Urim and Thummim were called by those names: The term "Urim" is like the Hebrew word for "lights," and thus it was called "Urim" because it enlightened. The term "Thummim" is like the Hebrew word tam meaning "to be complete," and thus it was called "Thummim" because its predictions were fulfilled. The Gemara discussed how they used the Urim and Thummim: Rabbi Johanan said that the letters of the stones in the breastplate stood out to spell out the answer. Resh Lakish said that the letters joined each other to spell words. But the Gemara noted that the Hebrew letter , tsade, was missing from the list of the 12 tribes of Israel. Rabbi Samuel bar Isaac said that the stones of the breastplate also contained the names of Abraham, Isaac and Jacob. But the Gemara noted that the Hebrew letter , teth, was also missing. Rav Aha bar Jacob said that they also contained the words: "The tribes of Jeshurun."

For every tribe that had sinned, the light of its stone became dim, and Joshua saw that the light of the stone for the tribe of Judah had become dim. So Joshua knew that the tribe of Judah had transgressed in the matter of the devoted things. Similarly, the Pirke De-Rabbi Eliezer taught that Saul saw the Philistines turning against Israel, and he knew that Israel had sinned in the matter of the ban. Saul looked at the 12 stones, and for each tribe that had followed the law, its stone (on the High Priest's breastplate) shined with its light, and for each tribe that had transgressed, the light of its stone was dim. So Saul knew that the tribe of Benjamin had trespassed in the matter of the ban.

The Mishnah reported that with the death of the former prophets, the Urim and Thummim ceased. In this connection, the Gemara reported differing views of who the former prophets were. Rav Huna said they were David, Samuel, and Solomon. Rav Nachman said that during the days of David, they were sometimes successful and sometimes not (getting an answer from the Urim and Thummim), for Zadok consulted it and succeeded, while Abiathar consulted it and was not successful, as  reports, "And Abiathar went up." (He retired from the priesthood because the Urim and Thummim gave him no reply.) Rabbah bar Samuel asked whether the report of 2 Chronicles , "And he (King Uzziah of Judah) set himself to seek God all the days of Zechariah, who had understanding in the vision of God," did not refer to the Urim and Thummim. But the Gemara answered that Uzziah did so through Zechariah's prophecy. A Baraita told that when the first Temple was destroyed, the Urim and Thummim ceased, and explained  (reporting events after the Jews returned from the Babylonian Captivity), "And the governor said to them that they should not eat of the most holy things till there stood up a priest with Urim and Thummim," as a reference to the remote future, as when one speaks of the time of the Messiah. Rav Nachman concluded that the term "former prophets" referred to a period before Haggai, Zechariah, and Malachi, who were latter prophets. And the Jerusalem Talmud taught that the "former prophets" referred to Samuel and David, and thus the Urim and Thummim did not function in the period of the First Temple, either.

Numbers chapter 28

A Midrash found in God's words to Abraham in  a reference to the goats that  required the Israelites to sacrifice on festivals. Reading , "And He said to him: 'Take me a heifer of three years old (meshuleshet), a she-goat of three years old (meshuleshet), and a ram of three years old (meshulash),'" the Midrash read , meshuleshet, to mean "three-fold" or "three kinds," indicating sacrifices for three different purposes. The Midrash deduced that God thus showed Abraham three kinds of bullocks, three kinds of goats, and three kinds of rams that Abraham's descendants would need to sacrifice. The three kinds of bullocks were: (1) the bullock that  would require the Israelites to sacrifice on the Day of Atonement (Yom Kippur), (2) the bullock that  would require the Israelites to bring on account of unwitting transgression of the law, and (3) the heifer whose neck  would require the Israelites to break. The three kinds of goats were: (1) the goats that  would require the Israelites to sacrifice on festivals, (2) the goats that  would require the Israelites to sacrifice on the New Moon (Rosh Chodesh), and (3) the goat that  would require an individual to bring. The three kinds of rams were: (1) the guilt-offering of certain obligation that , for example, would require one who committed a trespass to bring, (2) the guilt-offering of doubt to which one would be liable when in doubt whether one had committed a transgression, and (3) the lamb to be brought by an individual. The Rabbis said that God showed Abraham the tenth of an ephah as well, for  says "all these (eleh)," just as  says, "And you shall bring the meal-offering that is made of these things (me-eleh)," and the use of "these" in both verses hints that both verses refer to the same thing. And reading , "But the bird divided he not," the Midrash deduced that God intimated to Abraham that the bird burnt-offering would be divided, but the bird sin-offering (which the dove and young pigeon symbolized) would not be divided.

The Mishnah taught that the prohibitions of  that "seven days shall there be no leaven found in your houses" and of  that "no leaven shall be seen in all your territory" applied to the first Passover; while at the second Passover, one could have both leavened and unleavened bread in one's house. And the Mishnah taught that for the first Passover, one was required to recite the Hallel when the Passover lamb was eaten; while the second Passover did not require the reciting of Hallel when the Passover lamb was eaten. But both the first and second Passovers required the reciting of Hallel when the Passover lambs were offered, and both Passover lambs were eaten roasted with unleavened bread and bitter herbs. And both the first and second Passovers took precedence over the Sabbath.

Rabbi Akiva (or some say Rabban Johanan ben Zakai) never said in the house of study that it was time to stop studying, except on the eve of Passover and the eve of the Yom Kippur. On the eve of Passover, it was because of the children, so that they might not fall asleep, and on the eve of the Day of Atonement, it was so that they should feed their children before the fast.

The Mishnah taught that the Priest's Courtyard in the Temple had 13 gates. One of the southern gates close to the west was called the Water Gate, because it was through that gate that they carried the jug of water for the libation of Sukkot. Rabbi Eliezer ben Yaakov taught that it was called the Water Gate because there the water became a stream and in the future it will come out from underneath the Temple.

The Babylonian Talmud reported that Rabbi Joḥanan said that one recites the blessing "Who has given us life, sustained us, and brought us to this time" (the Shehecheyanu) on Shemini Atzeret, as it is a Festival distinct from Sukkot, but one does not recite the blessing of time on the seventh day of Passover, because it is not a Festival distinct from Passover. Rabbi Levi bar Ḥama (or some say Rabbi Ḥama bar Ḥanina) said that Shemini Atzeret is a Festival in and of itself (and therefore requires its own blessing), as it is distinct from Sukkot with regard to three matters: with regard to the sukkah, as one is not obligated to sit in the sukkah on Shemini Atzeret; with regard to the lulav, as one is not obligated to take the four species on Shemini Atzeret; and with regard to the water libation, as one did not pour the water libation on the altar on Shemini Atzeret. The Gemara noted that Rabbi Judah said that while the priest poured the water libation all eight days with a vessel measuring one log, including on Shemini Atzeret, Shemini Atzeret is nevertheless distinct from the rest of Sukkot with regard to the other two matters.

In the Babylonian Talmud, Rav Naḥman bar Isaac cited , "On the eighth day you shall have a solemn assembly; you shall do no manner of servile labor," to indicate that Shemini Atzeret is distinct from the other days of Sukkot, as with regard to the second through seventh days of Sukkot,  say, "And on the day," indicating that each of the days from the second through the seventh are all continuations of the first day.

Summing up the law concerning the blessing of time on Shemini Atzeret, the Babylonian Talmud reported that Rav Naḥman said that one recites the blessing of time on Shemini Atzeret, while Rav Sheshet said that one does not. The Gemara concluded that the law is that one should recite the blessing of time on Shemini Atzeret.

Numbers chapter 29

The Mishnah taught that Divine judgment is passed on the world at four seasons (based on the world's actions in the preceding year)—at Passover for produce; at Shavuot for fruit; at Rosh Hashanah all creatures pass before God like children of maron (one by one), as  says, "He Who fashions the heart of them all, Who considers all their doings." And on Sukkot, judgment is passed in regard to rain.

Rabbi Meir taught that all are judged on Rosh Hashanah and the decree is sealed on Yom Kippur. Rabbi Judah, however, taught that all are judged on Rosh Hashanah and the decree of each and every one of them is sealed in its own time—at Passover for grain, at Shavuot for fruits of the orchard, at Sukkot for water. And the decree of humankind is sealed on Yom Kippur. Rabbi Jose taught that humankind is judged every single day, as  says, "What is man, that You should magnify him, and that You should set Your heart upon him, and that You should remember him every morning, and try him every moment?"

Rav Kruspedai said in the name of Rabbi Johanan that on Rosh Hashanah, three books are opened in Heaven—one for the thoroughly wicked, one for the thoroughly righteous, and one for those in between. The thoroughly righteous are immediately inscribed definitively in the book of life. The thoroughly wicked are immediately inscribed definitively in the book of death. And the fate of those in between is suspended from Rosh Hashanah to Yom Kippur. If they deserve well, then they are inscribed in the book of life; if they do not deserve well, then they are inscribed in the book of death. Rabbi Abin said that  tells us this when it says, "Let them be blotted out of the book of the living, and not be written with the righteous." "Let them be blotted out from the book" refers to the book of the wicked. "Of the living" refers to the book of the righteous. "And not be written with the righteous" refers to the book of those in between. "Blot me, I pray" refers to the book of the wicked. "Out of Your book" refers to the book of the righteous. "That you have written" refers to the book of those in between. It was taught in a Baraita that the House of Shammai said that there will be three groups at the Day of Judgment—one of thoroughly righteous, one of thoroughly wicked, and one of those in between. The thoroughly righteous will immediately be inscribed definitively as entitled to everlasting life; the thoroughly wicked will immediately be inscribed definitively as doomed to Gehinnom, as  says, "And many of them who sleep in the dust of the earth shall awake, some to everlasting life and some to reproaches and everlasting abhorrence." Those in between will go down to Gehinnom and scream and rise again, as  says, "And I will bring the third part through the fire, and will refine them as silver is refined, and will try them as gold is tried. They shall call on My name and I will answer them." Of them, Hannah said in 1 Samuel , "The Lord kills and makes alive, He brings down to the grave and brings up."

A Baraita taught that on Rosh Hashanah, God remembered each of Sarah, Rachel, and Hannah and decreed that they would bear children.

Rabbi Abbahu taught that Jews sound a blast with a shofar made from a ram's horn on Rosh Hashanah, because God instructed them to do so to bring before God the memory of the binding of Isaac, in whose stead Abraham sacrificed a ram, and thus God will ascribe it to worshipers as if they had bound themselves before God. Rabbi Isaac asked why one sounds (tokin) a blast on Rosh Hashanah, and the Gemara answered that God states in  "Sound (tiku) a shofar."

Rabbi Joshua son of Korchah taught that Moses stayed on Mount Sinai 40 days and 40 nights, reading the Written Law by day, and studying the Oral Law by night. After those 40 days, on the 17th of Tammuz, Moses took the Tablets of the Law, descended into the camp, broke the Tablets in pieces, and killed the Israelite sinners. Moses then spent 40 days in the camp, until he had burned the Golden Calf, ground it into powder like the dust of the earth, destroyed the idol worship from among the Israelites, and put every tribe in its place. And on the New Moon (Rosh Chodesh) of Elul (the month before Rosh Hashanah), God told Moses in  "Come up to Me on the mount," and let them sound the shofar throughout the camp, for, behold, Moses has ascended the mount, so that they do not go astray again after the worship of idols. God was exalted with that shofar, as  says, "God is exalted with a shout, the Lord with the sound of a trumpet." Therefore, the Sages instituted that the shofar should be sounded on the New Moon of Elul every year.

The Jerusalem Talmud reported that Jews wear white on the High Holy Days. Rabbi Hama the son of Rabbi Hanina and Rabbi Hoshaiah disagreed about how to interpret , "And what great nation is there, that has statutes and ordinances so righteous as all this law." One said: "And what great nation is there?" Ordinarily those who know they are on trial wear black, wrap themselves in black, and let their beards grow, since they do not know how their trial will turn out. But that is not how it is with Israel. Rather, on the day of their trial, on Rosh Hashanah, they wear white, wrap themselves in white, and shave their beards and eat, drink, and rejoice, for they know that God does miracles for them. The other said: "And what great nation is there?" Ordinarily, if the ruler directs that the trial is on a certain day, and the robber says that the trial is on the next day, they listen to the ruler. But that is not how it is with God. The earthly court says that Rosh Hashanah falls on a certain day, and God directs the ministering angels to set up the platform, let the defenders rise, and let the prosecutors rise, for God's children have announced, that it is Rosh Hashanah. If the court determined that the month of Elul spanned a full 30 days, so that Rosh Hashanah would fall on the next day, then God would direct the ministering angels to remove the platform, remove the defense attorneys, remove the prosecutors, for God's children had declared Elul a full month. For  says of Rosh Hashanah, "For it is a statute for Israel, an ordinance of the God of Jacob," and thus if it is not a statute for Israel, then it also is not an ordinance of God.

Rabbi Yannai taught that from the very beginning of the world's creation, God foresaw the deeds of the righteous and the wicked, and provided Yom Kippur in response. And , "one day," teaches that God gave the righteous one day—Yom Kippur.

Similarly, Rabbi Judah bar Simon interpreted , "And God called the light day," to symbolize Jacob/Israel; "and the darkness he called night," to symbolize Esau; "and there was evening," to symbolize Esau; "and there was morning," to symbolize Jacob. And "one day" teaches that God gave Israel one unique day over which darkness has no influence—the Day of Atonement.

The Mishnah taught that the High Priest said a short prayer in the outer area. The Jerusalem Talmud taught that this was the prayer of the High Priest on the Day of Atonement, when he left the Holy Place whole and in one piece: "May it be pleasing before you, Lord, our God of our fathers, that a decree of exile not be issued against us, not this day or this year, but if a decree of exile should be issued against us, then let it be exile to a place of Torah. May it be pleasing before you, Lord, our God and God of our fathers, that a decree of want not be issued against us, not this day or this year, but if a decree of want should be issued against us, then let it be a want because of the performance of religious duties. May it be pleasing before you, Lord, our God and God of our fathers, that this year be a year of cheap food, full bellies, good business; a year in which the earth forms clods, then is parched so as to form scabs, and then moistened with dew, so that your people, Israel, will not be in need of the help of one another. And do not heed the prayer of travelers that it not rain." The Rabbis of Caesarea added, "And concerning your people, Israel, that they not exercise dominion over one another." And for the people who live in the Sharon plain he would say this prayer, "May it be pleasing before you, Lord, our God and God of our fathers, that our houses not turn into our graves."

Reading Song of Songs , Rabbi Joshua ben Levi compared Israel to a nut-tree. Rabbi Azariah taught that just as when a nut falls into the dirt, you can wash it, restore it to its former condition, and make it fit for eating, so however much Israel may be defiled with iniquities all the rest of the year, when the Day of Atonement comes, it makes atonement for them, as  says, "For on this day shall atonement be made for you, to cleanse you."

Resh Lakish taught that great is repentance, for because of it, Heaven accounts premeditated sins as errors, as  says, "Return, O Israel, to the Lord, your God, for you have stumbled in your iniquity." "Iniquity" refers to premeditated sins, and yet Hosea calls them "stumbling," implying that Heaven considers those who repent of intentional sins as if they acted accidentally. But the Gemara said that that is not all, for Resh Lakish also said that repentance is so great that with it, Heaven accounts premeditated sins as though they were merits, as  says, "And when the wicked turns from his wickedness, and does that which is lawful and right, he shall live thereby." The Gemara reconciled the two positions, clarifying that in the sight of Heaven, repentance derived from love transforms intentional sins to merits, while repentance out of fear transforms intentional sins to unwitting transgressions.

The Jerusalem Talmud taught that the evil impulse (yetzer hara) craves only what is forbidden. The Jerusalem Talmud illustrated this by relating that on the Day of Atonement, Rabbi Mana went to visit Rabbi Haggai, who was feeling weak. Rabbi Haggai told Rabbi Mana that he was thirsty. Rabbi Mana told Rabbi Haggai to go drink something. Rabbi Mana left and after a while came back. Rabbi Mana asked Rabbi Haggai what happened to his thirst. Rabbi Haggai replied that when Rabbi Mana told him that he could drink, his thirst went away.

The Mishnah taught that a sukkah can be no more than 20 cubits high. Rabbi Judah, however, declared taller sukkot valid. The Mishnah taught that a sukkah must be at least 10 handbreadths high, have three walls, and have more shade than sun. The House of Shammai declared invalid a sukkah made 30 days or more before the festival, but the House of Hillel pronounced it valid. The Mishnah taught that if one made the sukkah for the purpose of the festival, even at the beginning of the year, it is valid.

The Mishnah taught that a sukkah under a tree is as invalid as a sukkah within a house. If one sukkah is erected above another, the upper one is valid, but the lower is invalid. Rabbi Judah said that if there are no occupants in the upper one, then the lower one is valid.

It invalidates a sukkah to spread a sheet over the sukkah because of the sun, or beneath it because of falling leaves, or over the frame of a four-post bed. One may spread a sheet, however, over the frame of a two-post bed.

It is not valid to train a vine, gourd, or ivy to cover a sukkah and then cover it with sukkah covering (s'chach). If, however, the sukkah-covering exceeds the vine, gourd, or ivy in quantity, or if the vine, gourd, or ivy is detached, it is valid. The general rule is that one may not use for sukkah-covering anything that is susceptible to ritual impurity (tumah) or that does not grow from the soil. But one may use for sukkah-covering anything not susceptible to ritual impurity that grows from the soil.

Bundles of straw, wood, or brushwood may not serve as sukkah-covering. But any of them, if they are untied, are valid. All materials are valid for the walls.

Rabbi Judah taught that one may use planks for the sukkah-covering, but Rabbi Meir taught that one may not. The Mishnah taught that it is valid to place a plank four handbreadths wide over the sukkah, provided that one does not sleep under it.

Rabbi Joshua maintained that rejoicing on a Festival is a religious duty. For it was taught in a Baraita: Rabbi Eliezer said: A person has nothing else to do on a Festival aside from either eating and drinking or sitting and studying. Rabbi Joshua said: Divide it: Devote half of the Festival to eating and drinking, and half to the House of Study. Rabbi Johanan said: Both deduce this from the same verse. One verse  says, "a solemn assembly to the Lord your God," while  says, "there shall be a solemn assembly to you." Rabbi Eliezer held that this means either entirely to God or entirely to you. But Rabbi Joshua held: Divide it: Devote half the Festival to God and half to yourself.

If its top is broken off or its leaves detached from the stem, it is invalid. If its leaves are merely spread apart but still joined to the stem at their roots, it is valid. Rabbi Judah taught that in that case, one should tie the leaves at the top. A palm-branch that is three handbreadths in length, long enough to wave, is valid. The Gemara explained that a withered palm branch fails to meets the requirement of  because it is not (in the term of ) "goodly." Rabbi Johanan taught in the name of Rabbi Simeon ben Yohai that a stolen palm-branch is unfit because use of it would be a precept fulfilled through a transgression, which is forbidden. Rabbi Ammi also stated that a withered palm-branch is invalid because it is not in the word of  "goodly," and a stolen one is invalid because it constitutes a precept fulfilled through a transgression.

Similarly, the Mishnah taught that a stolen or withered myrtle is not valid. If its tip is broken off, or its leaves are severed, or its berries are more numerous than its leaves, it is invalid. But if one picks off berries to diminish their number, it is valid. One may not, however, pick them on the Festival.

Similarly, the Mishnah taught that a stolen or withered willow-branch is invalid. One whose tip is broken off or whose leaves are severed is invalid. One that has shriveled or lost some of its leaves, or one grown in a naturally watered soil, is valid.

Rabbi Ishmael taught that one must have three myrtle-branches, two willow-branches, one palm-branch, and one etrog. Even if two of the myrtle-branches have their tips broken off and only one is whole, the lulav set is valid. Rabbi Tarfon taught that even if all three have their tips broken off, the set is valid. Rabbi Akiva taught that just as it is necessary to have only one palm-branch and one etrog, so it is necessary to have only one myrtle-branch and one willow-branch.

The Mishnah taught that an etrog that is stolen or withered is invalid. If the larger part of it is covered with scars, or if its nipple is removed, if it is peeled, split, perforated, so that any part is missing, it is invalid. If only its lesser part is covered with scars, if its stalk was missing, or if it is perforated but nothing of it is missing, it is valid. A dark-colored etrog is invalid. If it is green as a leek, Rabbi Meir declares it valid and Rabbi Judah declares it invalid. Rabbi Meir taught that the minimum size of an etrog is that of a nut. Rabbi Judah taught that it is that of an egg. Rabbi Judah taught that the maximum size is such that two can be held in one hand. Rabbi Jose said even one that can be hold only in both hands.

The Mishnah taught that the absence of one of the four kinds of plants used for the lulav—the palm-branch, the etrog, the myrtle, or the willow—invalidates the others. The Gemara explained that this is because  says, "And you shall take," signifying the taking of them all together. Rav Hanan bar Abba argued that one who has all of the four species fulfills the requirement even if one does not take them in hand bound together. They raised an objection from a Baraita that taught: Of the four kinds used for the lulav, two—the etrog and the palm—are fruit-bearing, and two—the myrtle and the willow—are not. Those that bear fruit must be joined with those that do not bear fruit, and those that do not bear fruit must be joined with those that bear fruit. Thus a person does not fulfill the obligation unless they are all bound in one bundle. And so it is, the Baraita taught, with Israel's conciliation with God: It is achieved only when the people of Israel are united as one group.

Rabbi Mani taught that , "All my bones shall say: 'Lord, who is like You?'" alludes to the lulav. The rib of the lulav resembles the spine; the myrtle resembles the eye; the willow resembles the mouth; and the etrog resembles the heart. The Psalmist teaches that no parts of the body are greater than these, which outweigh in importance the rest of the body.

The Gemara taught that one who prepares a lulav recites the blessing, ". . . Who has given us life, has sustained us, and has enabled us to reach this season." When one takes the lulav to fulfill the obligation under , one recites: ". . . Who has sanctified us with Your commandments and has commanded us concerning the taking of the lulav." One who makes a sukkah recites: "Blessed are You, O Lord . . . Who has given us life, has sustained us, and has enabled us to reach this season." When one enters to sit in a sukkah, one recites: "Blessed are You . . . Who has sanctified us with Your commandments and has commanded us to sit in the sukkah."

Rabbi Eliezer taught that during the seven days of Sukkot, one must eat 14 meals in a sukkah—one on each day and one on each night. The Sages of the Mishnah, however, taught that one is not required to eat a fixed number of meals a sukkah, except that one must eat a meal in a sukkah on the first night of Sukkot. Rabbi Eliezer said in addition that if one did not eat in a sukkah on the first night of Sukkot, one may make up for it on the last night of the Festival. The Sages of the Mishnah, however, taught that there is no making up for this, and of this  said: "That which is crooked cannot be made straight, and that which is wanting cannot be numbered." And so, just as in a normal dwelling, one has one meal by day and one by night, so in the sukkah, one should have one meal by day and one by night. And the Gemara explained that the Sages taught that , "You shall dwell," implies that just as in one's dwelling, one eats if one wishes, and does not eat if one does not wish, so also with a sukkah one eats only if one wishes. But if so, the Gemara asked, why is the meal on the first night mandatory? Rabbi Johanan answered in the name of Rabbi Simeon ben Jehozadak that with regard to Sukkot,  says "the fifteenth," just as  says "the fifteenth" with regard to Passover (implying similarity in the laws for the two Festivals). And for Passover,  says, "At evening you shall eat unleavened bread," indicating that only the first night is obligatory (to eat unleavened bread). So also for Sukkot, the only first night is also obligatory (to eat in the sukkah). The Gemara then reported that Bira said in the name of Rabbi Ammi that Rabbi Eliezer recanted his statement that one is obliged to eat 14 meals in the sukkah, and changed his position to agree with the Sages. The Gemara taught that a desert later in the holiday may be regarded as a compensating meal to fulfill one's obligation to eat the first meal.

Noting that  required the priests to offer 70 bulls over the seven days of Sukkot, Rabbi Eleazar taught that the 70 bulls correspond to the 70 nations of the world. And Rabbi Eleazar taught that the single bull that  required the priests to offer on Shemini Atzeret corresponds to the unique nation of Israel. Rabbi Eleazar compared this to a mortal king who told his servants to prepare a great banquet, but on the last day told his beloved friend to prepare a simple meal so that the king might enjoy his friend's company. Similarly, a Midrash taught that on Sukkot, the Israelites offered God 70 bulls as an atonement for the 70 nations. The Israelites then complained to God that they had offered 70 bulls on behalf of the nations of the world, and they ought thus to love Israel, but they still hated the Jews. As  says, "In return for my love they are my adversaries." And the Midrash compared this to the case of a king who made a banquet for seven days and invited all the people in the province. And when the seven days of the feast were over, he said to his friend that he had done his duty to all the people of the province, now the two of them would eat whatever the friend could find—a pound of meat, fish, or vegetables.

Noting that the number of sacrifices in  decreases each day of Sukkot, a Midrash taught that the Torah thus teaches etiquette from the sacrifices. If a person stays as a friend's house, on the first day, the host entertains generously and serves poultry, on the second day meat, on the third day fish, on the fourth day vegetables, and so the host continually reduces the fare until the host serves the guest beans.

Noting that  enumerates specific sacrifices for each day of Sukkot, while  does not enumerate specific sacrifices for each day of Passover, the Gemara concluded that Jews should recite the whole Hallel on each day of Sukkot, as opposed to reciting the whole Hallel only on the first day of Passover.

Rabbi Joshua maintained that rejoicing on a Festival is a religious duty. For it was taught in a Baraita: Rabbi Eliezer said: A person has nothing else to do on a Festival aside from either eating and drinking or sitting and studying. Rabbi Joshua said: Divide it: Devote half of the Festival to eating and drinking, and half to the House of Study. Rabbi Johanan said: Both deduce this from the same verse. One verse  says, "a solemn assembly to the Lord your God," while  says, "there shall be a solemn assembly to you." Rabbi Eliezer held that this means either entirely to God or entirely to you. But Rabbi Joshua held: Divide it: Devote half the Festival to God and half to yourself.

In medieval Jewish interpretation

The parashah is discussed in these medieval Jewish sources:

Numbers chapter 25
Following the Mishnah (see "In classical rabbinic interpretation" above), Maimonides acknowledged that based on Phinehas's slaying of Zimri, a zealot would be considered praiseworthy to strike a man who has sexual relations with a gentile woman in public, that is, in the presence of ten or more Jews. But Maimonides taught that the zealot could strike the fornicators only when they were actually engaged in the act, as was the case with Zimri, and if the transgressor ceased, he should not be slain, and if the zealot then killed the transgressor, the zealot could be executed as a murderer. Further, Maimonides taught that if the zealot came to ask permission from the court to kill the transgressor, the court should not instruct the zealot to do so, even if the zealot consulted the court during the act.

The Zohar explained that this does not mean that the covenant was on account of Phinehas, or that he was in conflict with the covenant, but that it was then firmly attached to its place. The Zohar deduced this from the combination of the words "covenant" and "peace," as if to say, "Behold I give to him the peaceful confirmation of the covenant in its place," from which it had been torn by the transgressors. And similarly, "and it shall be to him and to his seed after him the covenant of an everlasting priesthood, because he was jealous for his God."

Numbers chapter 27

Numbers chapter 28
Maimonides taught that the object of the Sabbath (mentioned in ) was the rest that it affords. One-seventh of the life of every person, small or great, passes in comfort and rest from trouble and exertion. In addition, the Sabbath perpetuates remembrance of the Creation.

Maimonides taught that the object of Yom Kippur (mentioned in ) is the sense of repentance that its fast creates. Maimonides noted that it was on Yom Kippur that Moses came down from Mount Sinai with the second tablets and announced to the Israelites God's pardon of their sin with the Golden Calf. God therefore appointed Yom Kippur forever as a day devoted to repentance and the true worship of God. For this reason, the law interdicts all material enjoyment, trouble and care for the body, and work, so that people might spend the day confessing their sins and abandoning them.

Maimonides taught that the other holy days were appointed for rejoicing and for the pleasant gathering that people generally need. The holy days also promote the good feeling that people should have to each other in their social and political relations.

According to Maimonides, Passover (mentioned in ) is kept seven days, because a week is the intermediate unit of time between a day and a month. Passover teaches people to remember the miracles that God performed in Egypt, encouraging people to thank God repeatedly and to lead a modest and humble life. Jews therefore eat unleavened bread and bitter herbs on Passover in memory of what happened to the Israelites. And they eat unleavened bread for a week because if the eating were only for one day, Jews might not notice it.

Maimonides taught that Shavuot (mentioned in ) is the anniversary of the Revelation on Mount Sinai. To increase the importance of this day, Jews count the days that pass from the preceding festival of Passover, just as one who expects an intimate friend to visit on a certain day counts the days and even the hours until the friend comes. This is why Jews count the days that pass since the offering of the Omer, between the anniversary of the Israelites' departure from Egypt and the anniversary of the Lawgiving. As the Revelation at Mount Sinai took place on one day, so Jews keep its anniversary only one day.

Maimonides wrote that Jews likewise keep Rosh Hashanah (mentioned in ) for one day, for it is a day of repentance, on which Jews are stirred up from forgetfulness, and for this reason the shofar is blown on that day. According to Maimonides, Rosh Hashanah is a preparation for and an introduction to Yom Kippur, as is plain from the tradition about the days between Rosh Hashanah and Yom Kippur.

Maimonides taught that Sukkot (discussed in ), which is a feast of rejoicing and gladness, is kept seven days, so that the festival may be more noticeable. It is kept in the autumn because, as  says, it is "When you have gathered in your labors out of the field," and thus when people can rest free from pressing labors. Maimonides cited the ninth book of Aristotle's Ethics for the proposition that harvest festivals were a general custom, quoting Aristotle to report, "In ancient times, the sacrifices and assemblies of the people took place after the ingathering of the corn and the fruit, as if the sacrifices were offered on account of the harvest." Maimonides noted the temperate nature of autumn as another reason for Sukkot falling in that season, making it possible to dwell in booths free of great heat and troublesome rain. Maimonides taught that Sukkot reminds Jews of the miracles that God performed in the wilderness, once again to induced Jews to thank God and lead a modest and humble life. And Jews join to Sukkot the Feast of Shemini Atzeret to complete in the comfort of their homes their rejoicings, which cannot be perfect in booths. To remember this, Jews take the most pleasant fruit of the land, branches that smell best, most beautiful leaves, and also the best of herbs, that is, the willows of the brook. The four species joined in the lulav and etrog also were (1) plentiful in those days in the Land of Israel, so that everyone could easily get them, (2) of a good appearance, and in the case of the etrog and myrtle, excellent smell, and (3) keep fresh and green for seven days.

Numbers chapter 29
Rashi taught that the 70 bulls that  calls for sacrificing during Sukkot corresponded to the 70 nations, and that the number of bulls sacrificed progressively decreased over the course of Sukkot symbolized the nations' eventual destruction. The sacrifices during the time of the Temple shielded the nations from adversity.

In modern interpretation
The parashah is discussed in these modern sources:

Numbers chapter 25
Olson noted these similarities: (1) In both stories, the people worship and make sacrifices to another god. (4) The Levites kill 3,000 of those guilty of worshiping the Golden Calf, and the Israelite leaders are instructed to kill the people who had yoked themselves to the Baal of Peor. (6) After the Golden Calf incident, Moses "makes atonement" for Israel, and in the Baal Peor episode, Phinehas "makes atonement" for Israel. (7) A plague is sent as punishment in both incidents.

George Buchanan Gray wrote that the Israelite men's participation in the sacrificial feasts followed their intimacy with the women, who then naturally invited their paramours to their feasts, which, according to custom, were sacrificial occasions. Gray considered that it would have been in accord with the sentiment of early Israelites to worship the Moabite god on his own territory. Similarly, Frymer-Kensky wrote that the cataclysm began with a dinner invitation from the Moabite women, who perhaps wanted to be friendly with the people whom Balaam had tried, but failed, to curse.

Since the nature of Phinehas's act, killing with his own hands, left his heart filled with intense emotional unrest, God provided a means to soothe him so that he could cope with his situation and find peace and tranquility.

Tamara Cohn Eskenazi found the opening scene of  disturbing for a number of reasons: (1) because the new generation of Israelites fell prey to idolatry within view of the Promised Land; (2) because God rewarded Phinehas for acting violently and without recourse to due process; and (3) because women receive disproportionate blame for the people's downfall. Eskenazi taught that God rewarded Phinehas, elevating him above other descendants of Aaron, because of Phinehas's swift and ruthless response to idolatry, unlike his grandfather Aaron, who collaborated with idolaters in the case of the Golden Calf. By demonstrating unflinching loyalty to God, Phinehas restored the stature of the priests as deserving mediators between Israel and God.

Numbers chapter 26
That there were 12 tribes seems to have become unchangeable at an early stage of Israel's history, perhaps because of the number of lunar months in a year. Levi had originally been a tribe like any other with its own tribal land, but then Levi became essentially landless, a scattered people of priests and religious functionaries, with only a few cities of their own. To compensate for its absence, the Israelites counted the territory elsewhere attributed to Joseph as two territories, each with its own ancestor figure. And thus the tribal list in  could omit the Levites and, by replacing Joseph with Ephraim and Manasseh, still include the names of 12 tribes.

Numbers chapter 27
Bamberger reported that the inability of Moses to handle these cases on his own troubled the Rabbis.

Pinchas Peli argued that even though God endorsed Phinehas's action and Moses no doubt approved, it frightened Moses, the experienced and trained leader, who could not see how this zealot, who in a moment of crisis decided to take the law into his own hands, could become the permanent leader of the Israelite people. Citing Rashi and the Midrash, Peli read Moses's prayer to ask God for a leader who would be able to bear with the Israelites' differing spirits. Peli argued that a true leader is not a single-minded fanatic, but a person able to tolerate all views, able to stand up for what is right, but also capable of changing his or her mind.

Nehama Leibowitz noted that children of Moses did not inherit their father's position or any other appointment. , the passage concerned with his successor, does not refer to his children. Nowhere in his prayer regarding his successor did Moses nominate his sons to succeed him or express any echo of his grievance that God had not allowed him into the Promised Land. Leibowitz concluded that this absence drives home the lesson that the Torah does not come to people by inheritance, but only to those who labor in it.

Numbers chapter 28
In April 2014, the Committee on Jewish Law and Standards of Conservative Judaism ruled that women are now equally responsible for observing commandments as men have been. Women are thus responsible for observing the commandments of hearing the shofar on Rosh Hashanah (mentioned in ) and residing in a sukkah and taking up the lulav on Sukkot (discussed in ).

Commandments

According to Maimonides
Maimonides cited verses in the parashah for 12 positive and 6 negative commandments:
To judge in cases of inheritances
To offer the continual sacrifices daily
To offer an additional sacrifice every Sabbath
To offer an additional sacrifice at the beginning of each new month
To rest on the seventh day of the Festival of Passover
Not to do work on the Festival of Shavuot
To offer an additional sacrifice on the Festival of Shavuot
To hear the sound of the shofar on Rosh Hashanah
Not to do work on Rosh Hashanah
To offer an additional sacrifice on Rosh Hashanah
To offer an additional sacrifice on Yom Kippur
To fast on Yom Kippur
Not to do work on Yom Kippur ;,.
Not to do work on the first day of Sukkot
To offer an additional sacrifice on the Festival of Sukkot
To offer an additional sacrifice on the day of Shemini Atzeret, for this day is a pilgrimage festival in itself

Not to do work on the eighth day of Sukkot
Not to transgress in matters that one has forbidden himself

According to Sefer ha-Chinuch
According to Sefer ha-Chinuch, there are six positive commandments in the parashah.
The precept of the laws of inheritance
The precept of the regular olah offering, sacrificed every day
The precept of the musaf offering on the Sabbath
The precept of the musaf offering on Rosh Chodesh
The precept of the musaf offering on the Shavuot Festival
The precept of the shofar on Rosh Hashanah

In the liturgy
The Mussaf ("additional") prayer commemorates the special communal offerings that  instruct the priests to make on days of enhanced holiness.

After the morning blessings, some Jews recite the description of the continual (Tamid) offering in  among other descriptions of offerings.

The laws of the daily offering in  provide an application of the second of the Thirteen Rules for interpreting the Torah in the Baraita of Rabbi Ishmael that many Jews read as part of the readings before the Pesukei d'Zimrah prayer service. The second rule provides that similar words in different contexts invite the reader to find a connection between the two topics. The words "in its proper time" (bemoado) in  indicate that the priests needed to bring the daily offering "in its proper time," even on a Sabbath. Applying the second rule, the same words in  mean that the priests needed to bring the Passover offering "in its proper time," even on a Sabbath.

Jews read the description of the additional (Mussaf) Sabbath offering in  among the descriptions of offerings after the Sabbath morning blessings and again as part of the Mussaf Amidah prayer for the Sabbath.

On Rosh Chodesh (the first of the month), Jews read the description of the Rosh Chodesh offering in  among the descriptions of offerings after the morning blessings and again on Shabbat Rosh Chodesh as part of the Mussaf Amidah prayer for the Sabbath.

The Weekly Maqam
In the Weekly Maqam, Sephardi Jews each week base the songs of the services on the content of that week's parashah. For parashah Pinechas, Sephardi Jews apply Maqam Saba, the maqam that symbolizes a covenant (berit), which is appropriate because in the very opening of this parashah, God told Phinehas that due to his heroic acts, he was granted an eternal covenant of peace with God.

Haftarah
When the parashah falls after the Seventeenth of Tammuz, as it does during most years, Jews read for the haftarah the first of three readings of admonition leading up to Tisha B'Av, .

In leap years, when the haftarah for Pinechas is taken from 1 Kings, the haftarah from Jeremiah is not omitted. Instead it is read on the Sabbath following parashah Pinechas; the parashah for that sabbath is Matot, read separately rather than in combination with parashah Masei as is done in non-leap years.

1 Kings 18:46–19:21

Summary
The haftarah in  tells the story of the prophet Elijah's flight from King Ahab, his theophany, and his anointing of Elisha. God's hand was on Elijah, and he ran from King Ahab to Jezreel. Ahab told Queen Jezebel how Elijah had killed all the prophets of Baal, and Jezebel sent a messenger to tell Elijah that she intended to have him killed by the next day in recompense. So Elijah ran for his life to Beersheba in the Kingdom of Judah, left his servant there, and went a day's journey into the wilderness. Elijah sat down under a broom tree, asked God to take his life, and lay down and slept. An angel touched Elijah and told him to arise and eat, and Elijah found at his head a cake and a jar of water, and so he ate, drank, and went back to sleep. The angel again touched him again and told him to arise and eat, and he did and on the strength of that meal journeyed 40 days and 40 nights to Mount Horeb, the mount of God.

When he came to a cave and lodged there, God asked him what he was doing there. Elijah said that he had been moved by zeal for God, as the Israelites had forsaken God's covenant, thrown down God's altars, and killed God's prophets, leaving only Elijah, and they sought to kill him, too. God told Elijah to stand on the mount, and God passed by. A great wind rent the mountains, and broke the rocks in pieces, but God was not in the wind. Then an earthquake came, but God was not in the earthquake. Then a fire came, but God was not in the fire. And then came a still small voice, which asked him what he was doing there. Elijah repeated that he had been moved by zeal for God, as the Israelites had forsaken God's covenant, thrown down God's altars, and killed God's prophets, leaving only Elijah, and they sought to kill him, too. God told him to go to Damascus and anoint Hazael to be king over Aram, to anoint Jehu to be king over Israel, and to anoint Elisha to succeed Elijah as prophet. God foretold that any who escaped the sword of Hazael would be killed by Jehu; any who escaped the sword of Jehu would be killed by Elisha; and God would leave alive in Israel only the 7 thousand who had not bowed to Baal. So Elijah found Elisha, who was plowing with one of his 12 yoke of oxen, and Elijah cast his mantle on Elisha. Elisha left the oxen, asked Elijah for permission to kiss his parents goodbye, killed the oxen and distributed their meat to the people, and went to follow Elijah.

Connection to the parashah
Immediately before the parashah, Phinehas killed Zimri and Cozbi to stem the Israelites' following of Baal-Peor in the Heresy of Peor, while immediately before the haftarah, Elijah killed the prophets of Baal to stem the Israelites' following of Baal. Targum Jonathan to Exodus 6:18 thus identified Phinehas with Elijah. Additionally, the parasha and haftarah both address changes in leadership, from Moses to Joshua in the parashah, and from Elijah to Elisha in the Haftarah.

Jeremiah 1:1–2:3

Summary
The haftarah in  begins by identifying its words as those of Jeremiah the son of Hilkiah, a priest in Anathoth in the land of Benjamin, to whom God's word came in the thirteenth year of the reign of Josiah the son of Amon as king of Judah, in the reign of Josiah's son Jehoiakim, and through the eleventh year of the reign of Josiah's son Zedekiah, when Jerusalem was carried away captive.

God's word came to Jeremiah to say that before God formed him in the womb, God knew him, sanctified him, and appointed him a prophet to the nations. Jeremiah protested that he could not speak, for he was a child, but God told him not to fear, for he would go wherever God would send him, say whatever God would command him to say, and God would be with him to deliver him. Then God touched Jeremiah's mouth and said that God had put words in his mouth and set him over the nations to root out and to pull down, to destroy and to overthrow, to build and to plant. God asked Jeremiah what he saw, he replied that he saw the rod of an almond tree, and God said that he had seen well, for God watches over God's word to perform it.

God's word came to Jeremiah a second time to ask what he saw, he replied that he saw a seething pot tipping from the north, and God said that out of the north evil would break forth upon all Israel. For God would call all the kingdoms of the north to come, and they would set their thrones at Jerusalem's gate, against its walls, and against the cities of Judah. God would utter God's judgments against Judah, as its people had forsaken God and worshipped the work of their own hands. God thus directed Jeremiah to gird his loins, arise, and speak to the Judean people all that God commanded, for God had made Jeremiah a fortified city, an iron pillar, and brazen walls against the land of Judah, its rulers, its priests, and its people. They would fight against him, but they would not prevail, for God would be with him to deliver him.

God's word came to Jeremiah to tell him to go and cry in the ears of Jerusalem that God remembered the affection of her youth, her love as a bride, how she followed God in the wilderness. Israel was God's hallowed portion and God's first-fruits, and all that devoured Israel would be held guilty and evil would come upon them.

Connection to the special Sabbath
The Gemara taught that Jeremiah wrote the book of Lamentations, and as Jews read Lamentations on Tisha B'Av, this probably accounts for why a selection from Jeremiah begins the series of haftarot of admonition.

Notes

Further reading
The parashah has parallels or is discussed in these sources:

Biblical
 (laying on hands).
 (holidays);  (inquiry of God on the law).
 (census);  (Eleazar's family in charge of the sanctuary);  (laying on hands);  (Levites make atonement so that there be no plague because of children of Israel coming near to the sanctuary);  (Passover, inquiry of God on the law);  (inquiry of God on the law);  (children of Israel not coming near to the sanctuary); ; ;  (holidays).  (Phinehas, war with Midian);  (daughters of Zelophehad)
 (Joshua);  (Baal Peor);  (foreign women and apostasy);  (Three Pilgrim Festivals);  (Sukkot).
;  (daughters of Zelophehad);  (Tribes of Reuben, Gad, and Manasseh; Baal Peor); .
;  (Sukkot).
 (Urim).
 (banishment of Abiathar, competitor for the priesthood with Zadok of the line of Phinehas);  (Sukkot);  (northern feast like Sukkot).
 (permanent priesthood).
 (program of sacrifices);  (Sukkot).
 (Baal Peor).
 (Sukkot).
 (Sukkot);  (Phinehas);  (Phinehas).
 (Sukkot).
 (the line of Phinehas); ; ;  (Phinehas as chief of the sanctuary guards).
 (Sukkot);  (Sukkot);  (Three Pilgrim Festivals).

Early nonrabbinic
1 Maccabees chs. 1–16. (parallel to Phinehas).
4 Maccabees 18:12.
Josephus, Antiquities of the Jews 3:10:1–4; 4:6:12–13; 4:7:1–2 . Circa 93–94. In, e.g., The Works of Josephus: Complete and Unabridged, New Updated Edition. Translated by William Whiston. Peabody, Massachusetts: Hendrickson Publishers, 1987.
Instruction for Catechumens, and A Prayer of Praise of God for His Greatness, and for His Appointment of Leaders for His People, in "Hellenistic Synagogal Prayers," in James H. Charlesworth. The Old Testament Pseudepigrapha, volume 2, pages 687–88. New York: Doubleday, 1985.
Pseudo-Philo 28:1–4.
John  (Sukkot).
Targum Jonathan to Exodus 6:18 (Phinehas was Elijah).

Classical rabbinic
Mishnah: Pesachim 1:1–10:9; Yoma 1:1–8:9; Sukkah 1:1–5:8; Beitzah 1:1–5:7; Rosh Hashanah 1:1–4:9; Taanit 4:2; Megillah 3:5–6; Sotah 7:7; 9:12; Bava Batra 8:1–8; Sanhedrin 9:6; Shevuot 1:3; Zevachim 10:1; Menachot 4:2–3, 8:7–9:2; Tamid 1:1–7:4. Land of Israel, circa 200 C.E. In, e.g., The Mishnah: A New Translation. Translated by Jacob Neusner, pages 229–51, 265–307, 313, 321, 459, 464, 574–76, 604, 620, 721, 740, 750–51, 862–73. New Haven: Yale University Press, 1988.
Tosefta: Pisha (Pesachim) 1:1–10:13; Kippurim (Yoma) 1:1–4:17; Sukkah 1:1–4:28; Yom Tov (Beitzah) 1:1–4:11; Rosh Hashanah 1:1–2:18; Taanit 3:2; Megillah 3:7–9; Bava Batra 7:1–18; Makkot 3:4; Menachot 7:7, 9; 10:1; Meilah 1:16. Land of Israel, circa 250 CE. In, e.g., The Tosefta: Translated from the Hebrew, with a New Introduction. Translated by Jacob Neusner, volume 1, pages 471–522, 541–618, 629–30, 645–46; volume 2, pages 1126–30, 1206, 1434–36, 1449, 1541–42. Peabody, Massachusetts: Hendrickson Publishers, 2002.
Jerusalem Talmud: Berakhot 43b; Sheviit 5b; Orlah 2b; Shabbat 24a; Pesachim 1a–86a; Yoma 1a–57a; Sukkah 1a–33b; Beitzah 1a–49b; Rosh Hashanah 1a–27a; Taanit 22a; Megillah 19b, 26a, 32a; Chagigah 6b; Yevamot 68a; Nedarim 9b; Sotah 4b; Kiddushin 21b; Bava Batra 24a–25a, 27b; Sanhedrin 16a, 60b, 65b; Shevuot 5a, 6a, 7a–b, 21a. Tiberias, Land of Israel, circa 400 CE. In, e.g., Talmud Yerushalmi. Edited by Chaim Malinowitz, Yisroel Simcha Schorr, and Mordechai Marcus, volumes 1, 6a, 12–13, 18–19, 21–23, 25–27, 30, 33, 36, 40, 43–46. Brooklyn: Mesorah Publications, 2005–2019.
Genesis Rabbah 1:4; 6:3; 16:5; 37:3. Land of Israel, 5th century. In, e.g., Midrash Rabbah: Genesis. Translated by Harry Freedman and Maurice Simon, volume 1, pages 6–7, 42–43, 130, 296; volume 2, pages 510, 600, 655, 743, 875, 899, 911, 952, 968, 976, 980, 994. London: Soncino Press, 1939.

Babylonian Talmud: Berakhot 54b; Shabbat 21b, 24a–b, 36a, 64a, 80b, 97a, 103b, 131b, 133a; Eruvin 40a, 63a–b; Pesachim 2a–121b; Yoma 2a–88a; Sukkah 2a–56b; Beitzah 2a–40b; Rosh Hashanah 2a–35a; Taanit 2b–3a, 17b, 26a; Megillah 11a, 14a, 20b, 21b, 28a, 29b, 30b–31a; Moed Katan 9a, 19a, 20a, 27a; Chagigah 6a–b, 7b, 9a, 16a, 17a–18a; Yevamot 78b, 90b, 100b, 104b; Ketubot 13b, 52b; Nedarim 78a; Nazir 23b, 30a; Sotah 12a, 14a, 22b, 40b, 43a, 46a; Gittin 85a; Kiddushin 33b, 66b; Bava Kamma 42b, 82b, 88b, 92b, 111a, 112a; Bava Metzia 52b; Bava Batra 75a, 106b, 108a–39b, 141a, 143b, 147a; Sanhedrin 8a, 11b, 13b, 16a, 34b–35a, 40b, 43b–44b, 64a, 82a–b, 105b–06a, 110a; Makkot 7b, 12a; Shevuot 2a, 9a–11a; Avodah Zarah 8b, 19b, 44b; Horayot 6a, 10b, 12b; Zevachim 6b, 12a, 84a, 89a, 101b, 110b, 118a; Menachot 44b–45b, 46b, 49b, 52a, 65a, 72b, 84b, 87a–b, 89a, 91b, 93b, 99b, 103b, 104b, 107a; Chullin 60b, 134b; Bekhorot 5b, 17a; Arakhin 3b, 13b; Temurah 14a–b, 29a; Keritot 4a, 28b; Meilah 11b, 13b; Tamid 25b–33b; Niddah 26a. Babylonia, 6th Century. In, e.g., Talmud Bavli. Edited by Yisroel Simcha Schorr, Chaim Malinowitz, and Mordechai Marcus, 72 volumes. Brooklyn: Mesorah Pubs., 2006.

Medieval
Rashi. Commentary. Numbers 25–30. Troyes, France, late 11th Century. In, e.g., Rashi. The Torah: With Rashi's Commentary Translated, Annotated, and Elucidated. Translated and annotated by Yisrael Isser Zvi Herczeg, volume 4, pages 319–67. Brooklyn: Mesorah Publications, 1997.
Judah Halevi. Kuzari. part 2, ¶¶ 25–26, 80. Toledo, Spain, 1130–1140. In, e.g., Jehuda Halevi. Kuzari: An Argument for the Faith of Israel. Introduction by Henry Slonimsky, pages 101, 133. New York: Schocken Books, 1964.

Numbers Rabbah 21:1–25. 12th Century. In, e.g., Midrash Rabbah: Numbers. Translated by Judah J. Slotki. London: Soncino Press, 1939.
Abraham ibn Ezra. Commentary on the Torah. Mid-12th century. In, e.g., Ibn Ezra's Commentary on the Pentateuch: Numbers (Ba-Midbar). Translated and annotated by H. Norman Strickman and Arthur M. Silver, pages 215–37. New York: Menorah Publishing Company, 1999.
Maimonides. Mishneh Torah: Hilchot Yesodei HaTorah (The Laws that Are the Foundations of the Torah), chapter 7, ¶ 6. Egypt, circa 1170–1180. In, e.g., Mishneh Torah: Hilchot Yesodei HaTorah: The Laws which Are the Foundations of the Torah. Translated by Eliyahu Touger, volume 1, pages 252–59. New York: Moznaim Publishing, 1989.
Maimonides. Mishneh Torah: Hilchot Talmud Torah (The Laws of Torah Study), chapter 3, ¶ 1. Egypt, circa 1170–1180. In, e.g., Mishneh Torah: Hilchot De'ot: The Laws of Personality Development: and Hilchot Talmud Torah: The Laws of Torah Study. Translated by Za'ev Abramson and Eliyahu Touger, volume 2, pages 186–89. New York: Moznaim Publishing, 1989.

Maimonides. Mishneh Torah: Hilchot Shevitat Yom Tov (The Laws of Resting on the Holidays). Egypt, circa 1170–1180. In, e.g., Mishneh Torah: Hilchot Eruvin: The Laws of Eruvin: and Hilchot Sh'vitat Asor: The Laws of Resting on the Tenth (Day of Tishrei): and Hilchot Sh'vitat Yom Tov: The Laws of Resting on the Holidays). Translated by Eliyahu Touger, volume 11, pages 174–313. New York: Moznaim Publishing, 1993.
Maimonides. Mishneh Torah: Hilchot Chametz U'Matzah (The Laws of Chametz and Matzah). Egypt, circa 1170–1180. In, e.g., Mishneh Torah: Hilchot Chametz U'Matzah: The Laws of Chametz and Matzah: The Rambam's Text of the Haggadah . Translated by Eliyahu Touger. New York: Moznaim Publishing, 1988.
Maimonides. Mishneh Torah: Hilchot Shofar, Sukkah, V'Lulav (The Laws of the Shofar, Sukkah, and Lulav). Egypt, circa 1170–1180. In, e.g., Mishneh Torah: Hilchot Shofar, Sukkah, V'Lulav: The Laws of Shofar, Sukkah, and Lulav . Translated by Eliyahu Touger. New York: Moznaim Publishing, 1988.
Maimonides. Mishneh Torah: Hilchot Issurei Bi'ah (The Laws Governing Forbidden Sexual Relationships), chapter 12, halachot 4–5. In, e.g., Mishneh Torah: Sefer Kedushim: The Book of Holiness. Translated by Eliyahu Touger, pages 150–53. New York: Moznaim Publishing, 2002.
Maimonides. The Guide for the Perplexed, part 3, chapters 42, 46–47. Cairo, Egypt, 1190. In, e.g., Moses Maimonides. The Guide for the Perplexed. Translated by Michael Friedländer, pages 351, 363, 365, 369. New York: Dover Publications, 1956.

Hezekiah ben Manoah. Hizkuni. France, circa 1240. In, e.g., Chizkiyahu ben Manoach. Chizkuni: Torah Commentary. Translated and annotated by Eliyahu Munk, volume 4, pages 997–1020. Jerusalem: Ktav Publishers, 2013.
Nachmanides. Commentary on the Torah. Jerusalem, circa 1270. In, e.g., Ramban (Nachmanides): Commentary on the Torah: Numbers. Translated by Charles B. Chavel, volume 4, pages 296–343. New York: Shilo Publishing House, 1975.
Midrash ha-Ne'lam (The Midrash of the Concealed), part 1, pages 4d, 7a, 14a, 22d; part 2, page 21b. Spain, 13th century. In, e.g., The Zohar: Pritzker Edition. Translation and commentary by Nathan Wolski, volume 10, pages 17–18, 35–36, 118, 255, 521, 539. Stanford: Stanford University Press, 2016.
Zohar, part 3, pages 213a–241b. Spain, late 13th Century. In, e.g., The Zohar. Translated by Harry Sperling and Maurice Simon. 5 volumes. London: Soncino Press, 1934.
Jacob ben Asher (Baal Ha-Turim). Rimze Ba'al ha-Turim. Early 14th century. In, e.g., Baal Haturim Chumash: Bamidbar/Numbers. Translated by Eliyahu Touger, edited and annotated by Avie Gold, volume 4, pages 1667–709. Brooklyn: Mesorah Publications, 2003.
Jacob ben Asher. Perush Al ha-Torah. Early 14th century. In, e.g., Yaakov ben Asher. Tur on the Torah. Translated and annotated by Eliyahu Munk, volume 3, pages 1180–201. Jerusalem: Lambda Publishers, 2005.
Isaac ben Moses Arama. Akedat Yizhak (The Binding of Isaac). Late 15th century. In, e.g., Yitzchak Arama. Akeydat Yitzchak: Commentary of Rabbi Yitzchak Arama on the Torah. Translated and condensed by Eliyahu Munk, volume 2, pages 777–91. New York, Lambda Publishers, 2001.

Modern
Isaac Abravanel. Commentary on the Torah. Italy, between 1492 and 1509. In, e.g., Abarbanel: Selected Commentaries on the Torah: Volume 4: Bamidbar/Numbers. Translated and annotated by Israel Lazar, pages 274–317. Brooklyn: CreateSpace, 2015.
Obadiah ben Jacob Sforno. Commentary on the Torah. Venice, 1567. In, e.g., Sforno: Commentary on the Torah. Translation and explanatory notes by Raphael Pelcovitz, pages 784–801. Brooklyn: Mesorah Publications, 1997.

Moshe Alshich. Commentary on the Torah. Safed, circa 1593. In, e.g., Moshe Alshich. Midrash of Rabbi Moshe Alshich on the Torah. Translated and annotated by Eliyahu Munk, volume 3, pages 911–26. New York, Lambda Publishers, 2000.
Saul Levi Morteira. "When They Agitated Against God." Budapest, mid 1640s. In Marc Saperstein. Exile in Amsterdam: Saul Levi Morteira's Sermons to a Congregation of "New Jews," pages 430–46. Cincinnati: Hebrew Union College Press, 2005.
Avraham Yehoshua Heschel. Commentaries on the Torah. Cracow, Poland, mid 17th century. Compiled as Chanukat HaTorah. Edited by Chanoch Henoch Erzohn. Piotrkow, Poland, 1900. In Avraham Yehoshua Heschel. Chanukas HaTorah: Mystical Insights of Rav Avraham Yehoshua Heschel on Chumash. Translated by Avraham Peretz Friedman, pages 278–87. Southfield, Michigan: Targum Press/Feldheim Publishers, 2004.

Thomas Hobbes. Leviathan, 3:40, 42. England, 1651. Reprint edited by C. B. Macpherson, pages 506, 572. Harmondsworth, England: Penguin Classics, 1982.
Shabbethai Bass. Sifsei Chachamim. Amsterdam, 1680. In, e.g., Sefer Bamidbar: From the Five Books of the Torah: Chumash: Targum Okelos: Rashi: Sifsei Chachamim: Yalkut: Haftaros, translated by Avrohom Y. Davis, pages 460–533. Lakewood Township, New Jersey: Metsudah Publications, 2013.

Chaim ibn Attar. Ohr ha-Chaim. Venice, 1742. In Chayim ben Attar. Or Hachayim: Commentary on the Torah. Translated by Eliyahu Munk, volume 4, pages 1637–99. Brooklyn: Lambda Publishers, 1999.
Robert Burns. I Murder Hate. Scotland, 1790. In, e.g., The Complete Poetical Works of Robert Burns: Arranged in the Order of their Earliest Publication: Volume Second: Pieces Published Posthumously. Edited by William Scott Douglas, page 428. Kilmarnock, Scotland: M'kie and Drennan, 1876. Reprinted by Nabu Press, 2010. ("I would not die like Socrates, / For all the fuss of Plato; / Nor would I with Leonidas, / Nor yet would I with Cato: / The zealots of the church and state / Shall ne'er my mortal foe be; / But let me have bold Zimri's fate, / Within the arms of Cozbi!")

Samson Raphael Hirsch. Horeb: A Philosophy of Jewish Laws and Observances. Translated by Isidore Grunfeld, pages 136–41, 225–31, 487, 492–93, 512–13. London: Soncino Press, 1962. Reprinted 2002. Originally published as Horeb, Versuche über Jissroel's Pflichten in der Zerstreuung. Germany, 1837.

Emily Dickinson. Poem 112 (Where bells no more affright the morn —). Circa 1859. Poem 168 (If the foolish, call them "flowers" —). Circa 1860. Poem 597 (It always felt to me—a wrong). Circa 1862. In The Complete Poems of Emily Dickinson. Edited by Thomas H. Johnson, pages 53, 79–80, 293–94. New York: Little, Brown & Co., 1960.

Samuel David Luzzatto (Shadal). Commentary on the Torah. Padua, 1871. In, e.g., Samuel David Luzzatto. Torah Commentary. Translated and annotated by Eliyahu Munk, volume 4, pages 1107–12. New York: Lambda Publishers, 2012.
Yehudah Aryeh Leib Alter. Sefat Emet. Góra Kalwaria (Ger), Poland, before 1906. Excerpted in The Language of Truth: The Torah Commentary of Sefat Emet. Translated and interpreted by Arthur Green, pages 263–67. Philadelphia: Jewish Publication Society, 1998. Reprinted 2012.
Alexander Alan Steinbach. Sabbath Queen: Fifty-four Bible Talks to the Young Based on Each Portion of the Pentateuch, pages 129–32. New York: Behrman's Jewish Book House, 1936.
Julius H. Greenstone. Numbers: With Commentary: The Holy Scriptures, pages 279–311. Philadelphia: Jewish Publication Society, 1939. Reprinted by Literary Licensing, 2011.
Abram Spiro. "The Ascension of Phinehas." Proceedings of the American Academy for Jewish Research, volume 22 (1953): pages 91–114.
Isaac Mendelsohn. "Urim and Thummim." In The Interpreter's Dictionary of the Bible, volume 4, pages 739–40. Nashville, Tennessee: Abingdon Press, 1962.
Electric Prunes. "Kol Nidre." In Release of an Oath. Reprise Records, 1968. (track based on the Yom Kippur Kol Nidre prayer).
J. Roy Porter. "The Succession of Joshua." In Proclamation and Presence: Old Testament Essays in Honour of Gwynne Henton Davies. Edited by John I. Durham and J. Roy Porter, pages 102–32. London: SCM Press, 1970.
Stefan C. Reif. "What Enraged Phinehas?: A Study of Numbers 25:8." Journal of Biblical Literature, volume 90 (number 2) (June 1971): pages 200–06.
Moshe Greenberg. "Urim and Thummim." In Encyclopaedia Judaica, volume 16, pages 8–9. Jerusalem: Keter Publishing House, 1972. LCCN 72-90254.
Jacob Milgrom. "Magic, Monotheism, and the Sin of Moses." In The Quest for the Kingdom of God: Studies in Honor of George E. Mendenhall. Edited by H. B. Huffmon, F.A. Spina, A.R.W. Green, pages 251–265. Winona Lake, Indiana: Eisenbrauns, 1983.
Philip J. Budd. Word Biblical Commentary: Volume 5: Numbers, pages 274–319. Waco, Texas: Word Books, 1984.
Michael Fishbane. Biblical Interpretation in Ancient Israel, pages 98–99, 102–05, 112, 150, 152, 169, 171, 198, 209–10, 213, 224, 236, 256, 258, 304, 397–99, 529. Oxford: Oxford University Press, 1985.
Pinchas H. Peli. Torah Today: A Renewed Encounter with Scripture, pages 185–87. Washington, D.C.: B'nai B'rith Books, 1987.
Marc Gellman. "The Announcing Tool." In Does God Have a Big Toe? Stories About Stories in the Bible, pages 85–88. New York: HarperCollins, 1989.
Mark S. Smith. The Early History of God: Yahweh and the Other Deities in Ancient Israel, pages 66, 113. New York: HarperSanFrancisco, 1990..
Mary Douglas. In the Wilderness: The Doctrine of Defilement in the Book of Numbers, pages 55, 58, 86–87, 103, 108, 111–12, 114, 116, 121–23, 130, 135–36, 138, 141–42, 144–45, 147, 162, 170, 180, 182–83, 188, 190–92, 194, 197, 200, 203, 206, 235–36. Oxford: Oxford University Press, 1993. Reprinted 2004.
Judith S. Antonelli. "The Daughters of Zelophechad." In In the Image of God: A Feminist Commentary on the Torah, pages 377–82. Northvale, New Jersey: Jason Aronson, 1995.
Ellen Frankel. The Five Books of Miriam: A Woman's Commentary on the Torah, pages 234–36. New York: G. P. Putnam's Sons, 1996.

W. Gunther Plaut. The Haftarah Commentary, pages 396–406. New York: UAHC Press, 1996.
Sorel Goldberg Loeb and Barbara Binder Kadden. Teaching Torah: A Treasury of Insights and Activities, pages 272–77. Denver: A.R.E. Publishing, 1997.
Robert Goodman. Teaching Jewish Holidays: History, Values, and Activities. Denver: A.R.E. Publishing, 1997.
Judith Hauptman. "Inheritance." In Rereading the Rabbis: A Woman's Voice, pages 177–95. Boulder, Colorado: Westview Press, 1997.
Harriet C. Lutzky. "The Name 'Cozbi' (Numbers XXV 15, 18)." Vetus Testamentum, volume 47 (number 4) (October 1997): pages 546–49.
Cornelis Van Dam. The Urim and Thummin: A Means of Revelation in Ancient Israel. Winona Lake, Indiana: Eisenbrauns, 1997.
Tal Ilan. "How Women Differed." Biblical Archaeology Review, volume 24 (number 2) (March/April 1998).
William H.C. Propp. "Why Moses Could Not Enter The Promised Land." Bible Review, volume 14 (number 3) (June 1998).
Rachel Adelman. "Serah bat Asher: Songstress, Poet, and Woman of Wisdom." In Torah of the Mothers: Contemporary Jewish Women Read Classical Jewish Texts. Edited by Ora Wiskind Elper and Susan Handelman, pages 218–43. New York and Jerusalem: Urim Publications, 2000..
Dennis T. Olson. "Numbers." In The HarperCollins Bible Commentary. Edited by James L. Mays, pages 182–85. New York: HarperCollins Publishers, revised edition, 2000.
Sarah Idit (Susan) Schneider. "The Daughters of Tzlafchad: Towards a Methodology of Attitude Around Women's Issues." In Torah of the Mothers: Contemporary Jewish Women Read Classical Jewish Texts. Edited by Ora Wiskind Elper and Susan Handelman, pages 155–69. New York and Jerusalem: Urim Publications, 2000.
Pamela Wax. "Daughters and Inheritance Law." In The Women's Torah Commentary: New Insights from Women Rabbis on the 54 Weekly Torah Portions. Edited by Elyse Goldstein, pages 307–14. Woodstock, Vermont: Jewish Lights Publishing, 2000.
Lainie Blum Cogan and Judy Weiss. Teaching Haftarah: Background, Insights, and Strategies, pages 173–80. Denver: A.R.E. Publishing, 2002.

Louis H. Feldman. "The Portrayal of Phinehas by Philo, Pseudo-Philo, and Josephus." The Jewish Quarterly Review, volume 92 (number 3/4) (January–April 2002): pages 315–45.
Michael Fishbane. The JPS Bible Commentary: Haftarot, pages 250–62. Philadelphia: Jewish Publication Society, 2002.
Tikva Frymer-Kensky. "Cozbi." In Reading the Women of the Bible, pages 215–24, . New York: Schocken Books, 2002.
John J. Collins. "The Zeal of Phinehas: The Bible and the Legitimation of Violence." Journal of Biblical Literature, volume 122 (number 1) (Spring 2003): pages 3–21.
Robert Alter. The Five Books of Moses: A Translation with Commentary, pages 819–37. New York: W.W. Norton & Co., 2004.
Susan P. Fendrick. "Haftarat Pinchas: I Kings 18:46–19:21." In The Women's Haftarah Commentary: New Insights from Women Rabbis on the 54 Weekly Haftarah Portions, the 5 Megillot & Special Shabbatot. Edited by Elyse Goldstein, pages 195–99. Woodstock, Vermont: Jewish Lights Publishing, 2004.
Nili S. Fox. "Numbers." In The Jewish Study Bible. Edited by Adele Berlin and Marc Zvi Brettler, pages 335–43. New York: Oxford University Press, 2004.
Professors on the Parashah: Studies on the Weekly Torah Reading Edited by Leib Moscovitz, pages 280–83. Jerusalem: Urim Publications, 2005.
W. Gunther Plaut. The Torah: A Modern Commentary: Revised Edition. Revised edition edited by David E.S. Stern, pages 1072–97. New York: Union for Reform Judaism, 2006.
Suzanne A. Brody. "A bonanza." In Dancing in the White Spaces: The Yearly Torah Cycle and More Poems, page 100. Shelbyville, Kentucky: Wasteland Press, 2007.
Shai Cherry. "The Daughters of Zelophehad." In Torah Through Time: Understanding Bible Commentary, from the Rabbinic Period to Modern Times, pages 161–88. Philadelphia: The Jewish Publication Society, 2007.
James L. Kugel. How To Read the Bible: A Guide to Scripture, Then and Now, pages 64, 186, 197, 286, 318, 324, 355, 358, 404, 535. New York: Free Press, 2007.
The Torah: A Women's Commentary. Edited by Tamara Cohn Eskenazi and Andrea L. Weiss, pages 961–88. New York: URJ Press, 2008.
R. Dennis Cole. "Numbers." In Zondervan Illustrated Bible Backgrounds Commentary. Edited by John H. Walton, volume 1, pages 386–90. Grand Rapids, Michigan: Zondervan, 2009.

Steven Greenberg. "Pinchas, Zimri, and the Channels of Divine Will: Parashat Pinchas (Numbers 25:10–30:1)." In Torah Queeries: Weekly Commentaries on the Hebrew Bible. Edited by Gregg Drinkwater, Joshua Lesser, and David Shneer; foreword by Judith Plaskow, pages 216–19. New York: New York University Press, 2009.
Reuven Hammer. Entering Torah: Prefaces to the Weekly Torah Portion, pages 237–41. New York: Gefen Publishing House, 2009.
Raymond Westbrook and Bruce Wells. "Property and Inheritance." In Everyday Law in Biblical Israel: An Introduction, pages 91–106. Louisville, Kentucky: Westminster John Knox Press, 2009.
Alcita Ferreira Brown. Milcah. Booklocker, 2010. (novel about a daughter of Zelophehad).
Jonathan P. Burnside. "A 'Missing Case' in the Biblical Laws of Homicide and Asylum?" Vetus Testamentum, volume 60 (number 2) (2010): pages 288–91.
Terence E. Fretheim. "Numbers." In The New Oxford Annotated Bible: New Revised Standard Version with the Apocrypha: An Ecumenical Study Bible. Edited by Michael D. Coogan, Marc Z. Brettler, Carol A. Newsom, and Pheme Perkins, pages 228–34. New York: Oxford University Press, Revised 4th Edition 2010.
Adriane Leveen. "Inside Out: Jethro, the Midianites and a Biblical Construction of the Outsider." Journal for the Study of the Old Testament, volume 34 (number 4) (June 2010): pages 395–417.
The Commentators' Bible: Numbers: The JPS Miqra'ot Gedolot. Edited, translated, and annotated by Michael Carasik, pages 193–218. Philadelphia: Jewish Publication Society, 2011.

Josebert Fleurant. "Phinehas Murdered Moses' Wife: An Analysis of Numbers 25." Journal for the Study of the Old Testament, volume 35 (number 3) (March 2011): pages 285–94.

Calum Carmichael. "Sexual and Religious Seduction (Numbers 25–31)." In The Book of Numbers: A Critique of Genesis, pages 135–58. New Haven: Yale University Press, 2012.
Shmuel Herzfeld. "Three Educational Lessons." In Fifty-Four Pick Up: Fifteen-Minute Inspirational Torah Lessons, pages 234–37. Jerusalem: Gefen Publishing House, 2012.
Shlomo Riskin. Torah Lights: Bemidbar: Trials and Tribulations in Times of Transition, pages 205–42. New Milford, Connecticut: Maggid Books, 2012.
Juliana Claassens. "'Give us a portion among our father's brothers': The Daughters of Zelophehad, Land, and the Quest for Human Dignity." Journal for the Study of the Old Testament, volume 37 (number 3) (March 2013): pages 319–37.

Jonathan Sacks. Lessons in Leadership: A Weekly Reading of the Jewish Bible, pages 221–25. New Milford, Connecticut: Maggid Books, 2015.
Avivah Gottlieb Zornberg. Bewilderments: Reflections on the Book of Numbers, pages 263–311. New York: Schocken Books, 2015.
Jonathan Sacks. Essays on Ethics: A Weekly Reading of the Jewish Bible, pages 257–62. New Milford, Connecticut: Maggid Books, 2016.
Shai Held. The Heart of Torah, Volume 2: Essays on the Weekly Torah Portion: Leviticus, Numbers, and Deuteronomy, pages 168–78. Philadelphia: Jewish Publication Society, 2017.
Steven Levy and Sarah Levy. The JPS Rashi Discussion Torah Commentary, pages 138–40. Philadelphia: Jewish Publication Society, 2017.
Jonathan Sacks. Numbers: The Wilderness Years: Covenant & Conversation: A Weekly Reading of the Jewish Bible, pages 313–60. New Milford, Connecticut: Maggid Books, 2017.

External links

Texts
Masoretic text and 1917 JPS translation
Hear the parashah chanted 
Hear the parashah read in Hebrew

Commentaries

Academy for Jewish Religion, California
Academy for Jewish Religion, New York
Aish HaTorah 
Akhlah: The Jewish Children's Learning Network
Aleph Beta Academy
American Jewish University—Ziegler School of Rabbinic Studies
Anshe Emes Synagogue, Los Angeles 
Ari Goldwag
Ascent of Safed
Bar-Ilan University 
Chabad.org
eparsha.com
G-dcast
The Israel Koschitzky Virtual Beit Midrash
Jewish Agency for Israel
Jewish Theological Seminary
Kabbala Online
Mechon Hadar
Miriam Aflalo
MyJewishLearning.com
Ohr Sameach
Orthodox Union
OzTorah, Torah from Australia
Oz Ve Shalom—Netivot Shalom
Pardes from Jerusalem
Professor James L. Kugel
Professor Michael Carasik
Rabbi Dov Linzer
Rabbi Fabian Werbin
Rabbi Jonathan Sacks
RabbiShimon.com 
Rabbi Shlomo Riskin
Rabbi Shmuel Herzfeld
Rabbi Stan Levin
Reconstructionist Judaism
Sephardic Institute
Shiur.com
613.org Jewish Torah Audio
Tanach Study Center
TheTorah.com
Teach613.org, Torah Education at Cherry Hill
Torah from Dixie
Torah.org
TorahVort.com
Union for Reform Judaism
United Synagogue of Conservative Judaism
What's Bothering Rashi?
Yeshiva University
Yeshivat Chovevei Torah

Weekly Torah readings in Tammuz (Hebrew month)
Weekly Torah readings from Numbers